= List of proto-languages =

Below is a partial list of proto-languages that have been reconstructed, ordered by geographic location.

== Africa ==
- Proto-Afroasiatic
  - Proto-Semitic
  - Proto-Cushitic
  - Proto-Berber
  - Proto-Chadic
  - Proto-Omotic
- Proto-Niger–Congo
  - Proto-Bantu
  - Proto-Mande
  - Proto-Yoruboid

== Europe ==
- Proto-Basque
- Proto-Northwest Caucasian
  - Proto-Abazgi
  - Proto-Circassian
    - Proto-Kabardian
- Proto-Northeast Caucasian
- Proto-Indo-European
  - Proto-Albanian
  - Proto-Greek
  - Proto-Balto-Slavic
    - Proto-Baltic
    - Proto-Slavic
  - Proto-Celtic
    - Common Brittonic
  - Proto-Germanic
    - Proto-Norse
  - Proto-Italic
    - Proto-Romance
      - Common Romanian
- Proto-Uralic
  - Proto-Finno-Ugric
  - Proto-Finnic (Proto-Balto-Finnic)
    - Proto-Karelian
  - Proto-Samic

== West Asia ==
- Proto-Afroasiatic
  - Proto-Semitic
    - Proto-Arabic
- Proto-Indo-European
  - Proto-Anatolian
  - Proto-Armenian
  - Proto-Indo-Iranian
    - Proto-Iranian
- Proto-Kartvelian
  - Proto-Georgian–Zan

== North and Central Asia ==
- Proto-Turkic
- Proto-Mongolic
- Proto-Tungusic
- Proto-Yeniseian
- Proto-Uralic
  - Proto-Finno-Ugric
  - Proto-Mordvinic
  - Proto-Permic
  - Proto-Mansi
  - Proto-Khanty
  - Proto-Samoyed
- Proto-Chukotko-Kamchatkan
- Proto-Indo-European
  - Proto-Tocharian
  - Proto-Indo-Iranian
    - Proto-Iranian
- Proto-Ainu

== South Asia ==
- Proto-Dravidian
  - Proto-South Dravidian
- Proto-Indo-European
  - Proto-Indo-Iranian
    - Proto-Indo-Aryan
      - Early Romani
    - Proto-Nuristani

== Asian Pacific Rim ==
- Proto-Australian
  - Proto-Pama–Nyungan
    - Proto-Arandic
    - Proto-Thura-Yura
- Proto-Trans–New Guinea (list)
- Proto-Austronesian
  - Proto-Malayo-Polynesian
    - Proto-Malayic
    - Proto-Philippine
    - Proto-Oceanic
      - Proto-Central Pacific language
        - Proto-Polynesian
      - Proto-Admiralty Islands
      - Proto-Temotu language
      - Proto-Micronesian language
      - Proto-Torres–Banks language
- Proto-Koreanic
- Proto-Japonic
- Proto-Kra–Dai
  - Proto-Kra (list)
  - Proto-Kam–Sui (list)
  - Proto-Tai (list)
  - Proto-Hlai (list)
- Proto-Sino-Tibetan
  - Proto-Sinitic
    - Proto-Min
  - Proto-Tibeto-Burman
    - Proto-Loloish
    - Proto-Karenic
    - Proto-Tani
- Proto-Hmong–Mien (list)
  - Proto-Hmongic (list)
  - Proto-Mienic (list)
- Proto-Austroasiatic
  - Proto-Aslian (list)
  - Proto-Khmeric (list)
  - Proto-Palaungic (list)
  - Proto-Viet-Muong
  - Proto-Munda

== Americas ==
- Proto-Eskaleut language
  - Proto-Eskimo
    - Proto-Inuit
- Proto-Algic
  - Proto-Algonquian
- Proto-Muskogean
- Proto-Iroquoian
- Proto-Uto-Aztecan
  - Proto-Nahuan
- Proto-Mayan
- Proto-Mixe–Zoquean language
- Proto-Tanoan language
- Proto-Totonacan language
- Proto-Na-Dene
  - Proto-Athabaskan
- Proto-Oto-Manguean
  - Proto-Otomí
  - Proto-Mixtecan
    - Proto-Mixtec
- Proto-Tucanoan
- Proto-Tupian
- Proto-Macro-Jê
- Proto-Arawakan
- Proto-Tsimshian
- Proto-Salish
- Proto-Siouan

== Macrofamily reconstructions ==
These are hypothetical proto-languages that cannot be substantiated using the scientific methods of comparative linguistics.

- Proto-Altaic
- Proto-Borean
- Proto-Eurasiatic
- Proto-Ural-Altaic
- Proto-Austric
- Proto-Amerind
- Proto-Human language
