= M–T and N–M pronoun patterns =

Personal pronoun patterns in northern Eurasia and the Americas

Across the globe, two phonetic patterns of personal pronouns stand out statistically beyond accepted language families. These are the M–T pattern of northern Eurasia and the N–M pattern of western North America. Other phonetic patterns in pronouns are either statistically insignificant or are more localized.

In many languages of northern Eurasia, and extending into India, the first person singular ('1sg') pronoun or a pronominal affix has an m or m-like consonant (abbreviated 'M'), and the second person singular ('2sg') pronoun or affix has a t or t-like consonant (abbreviated 'T'). The first is usually a nasal /m/, though some languages have a non-nasal /b/; the second is a non-nasal coronal consonant such as /t, d, t͡ʃ, s/, all of which may derive historically from *t. This was recently the case in English, for example, with me, my, mine in 1sg and thou, thee, thine in 2sg. The M–T pattern has been used as an argument for several proposed long-distance language families, such as the Nostratic hypothesis, that include Indo-European as a subordinate branch; Nostratic has even been called 'Mitian' after these pronouns. However, several of the ancestral protolanguages are reconstructed to have had a *B–S pattern, with the 'B' becoming /m/ in some of the daughter languages, apparently through regional diffusion from neighboring M–T languages.

In many of the languages of western North America, but also sporadically elsewhere in America, the pronouns and pronominal affixes have a different pattern, of N in the 1sg and M in the 2sg. This has been used as evidence that all American languages are related (in the now debunked Amerind hypothesis), but corresponds more closely to the Penutian and Hokan proposals, which while controversial are broadly accepted as plausible hypotheses.

Because there is a limited stock of consonants for languages to draw from, and pronouns generally use only a subset of that stock, any common pattern can be expected anywhere in the world just by chance. These two patterns stand out because their frequency is much higher than would be expected by chance.

== Language families with an M–T pattern ==
An M–T pattern is found in languages of the Indo-European, Uralic, Yukaghir, Chukchi–Kamchatkan, Kartvelian, Turkic, Mongolic and Tungusic language families of Eurasia, these last three constituting the core of the Altaic hypothesis. More importantly, it is reconstructed for the ancestral proto-languages of these families, which is not the case for where the pattern has been noticed outside of Eurasia.

Note that most Indo-European languages of Europe do not have an 'M' form in the nominative case, using instead a form related to English I and Latin ego, an irregularity tracing back to Proto-Indo-European. These forms are included for completeness in the table below but are set off in parentheses. Proto-Turkic, Proto-Mongolic and Proto-Tungusic have a 1sg pronoun in *b, while the occurrence of /m/ in many of their daughter languages are the result of later sound changes. Proponents of a long-range relation of Turkic, Mongolic and Tungusic with other language families of northern Eurasia thus have to posit ad hoc an irregular sound change from *m to *b for these pronouns in order to claim that they are related to their counterparts in Proto-Uralic, Proto-Indo-European etc.

A historical sound change of *ti → *či → *si is quite common, occurring independently in Greek, Proto-Finnic and likely also in Proto-Mongolic. For those who believe that the correspondences below are not simply coincidental, one must posit that the same change happened in Turkic, Tungusic and Kartvelian.

Pronominal suffixes in the table (marked by a hyphen) may be object suffixes on a verb or possessive suffixes on a noun, depending on the language.

Plural forms are ignored. Some are closer to the M–T pattern than the singular is, for example Proto-Chukotko-Kamchatkan *muri 'we' and *turi 'you'. However, doubling the number of pronouns to be considered in this way increases the possibility of coincidental resemblance, and decreases the likelihood that the resulting pattern is significant.

Language families with 1sg M and 2sg T
Language	1sg M forms	2sg T forms
Proto-Indo-European	(*h₁eǵ-), *h₁mé, *h₁méne, *-mi	*tuH, *twé, *tewe, *-si
English	(I), me, my	thou, thee, thy
German	(ich), mich, mein	du, dich, dein
French	(je), moi, mon	tu, toi, ton
Spanish	(yo), me, mi	tú, te, tu
Welsh	mi, fi	ti, di
Irish	mé	tú
Greek	(εγώ egô), εμένα emena	εσύ esu, εσένα esena
Russian	(я ja), меня menyá, мой moy	ты ty, тебя tebjá
Persian	man مَن, -am ـم	to تو, -at ـت
Hindustani	मैं ~ میں maĩ, मुझे ~ مجھے mujhe	तू ~ تُو tū, तुझे ~ تجھے tujhe
Proto-Uralic	*minä	*tinä
Finnish	minä, minu-	sinä, sinu-
Hungarian	(én), -am	te, -ad
Proto-Yukaghir	*mət	*tət
Proto-Kartvelian	*me	*š(w)en-
Georgian	მე me	შენ šen
Proto-Turkic	*bë, *bän-, *-(I)m	*së, *sän-
Turkish	ben, ban-, -(I)m	sen, san-
Uzbek	men, -(i)m	sen
Proto-Mongolic	*bi, *binu	*ci, *cinu
Mongolian	би bi, (над nad), миний minii	чи či, чам čam, чиний činii
Proto-Tungusic	*bi	*si
Evenki	би bi	си si
Nanai	ми mi	си si
Proto-Chukotko-Kamchatkan	*kəm	*kəð
Chukchi	гым gym	гыт gyt
Itelmen	кэмма kemma, -мин -min	кэзза kezza, (-вин -win)

An M–T pattern occurs in non-Eurasian languages such as Fulani and Grebo in West Africa, Usan and Salt-Yui in New Guinea, and Miwok and Lakota in North America. However, the frequency is not statistically significant, while the incidence in northern Eurasia is much higher than would be expected by chance. Also, in these non-Eurasian families, the M–T pattern does not trace back to the protolanguage. For example, Lakota/Dakota 1sg mi- and ma- reconstruct as Proto-Siouan *wįꞏ and *wą, and while Dakota 2sg š- does trace back to Proto-Siouan 2sg *š-, this is an allomorph of the more general (and presumably ancestral) form *yi-.

Even if some of the language families listed in the table above do prove to be related (such as Indo-European and Uralic or the Altaic families), that doesn't mean that all Eurasian families with an M–T pattern are similarly related: some chance occurrence in Eurasia would be no more statistically significant than it is elsewhere in the world.

== Language families with an N–M pattern ==
It has long been observed that a remarkable number of Native American languages have a pronominal pattern with first-person singular forms in n and second-person singular forms in m. This pattern was first noted by Alfredo Trombetti in 1905. It caused Sapir to suggest that ultimately all Native American languages would turn out to be related. In a personal letter to A. L. Kroeber he wrote (Sapir 1918):

Getting down to brass tacks, how in the Hell are you going to explain general American n- 'I' except genetically? It's disturbing, I know, but (more) non-committal conservatism is only dodging, after all, isn't it? Great simplifications are in store for us.

The supposed "n/m – I/you" pattern has attracted attention even from those linguists who are normally critical of such long-distance proposals. Johanna Nichols investigated the distribution of the languages that have an n/m pattern and found that they are mostly confined to the western coast of the Americas, and that similarly they exist in East Asia and northern New Guinea. She suggested that they had spread through diffusion. This notion was rejected by Lyle Campbell, who argued that the frequency of the n/m pattern was not statistically elevated in either area compared to the rest of the world. Campbell also showed that several of the languages that have the contrast today did not have it historically and stated that the pattern was largely consistent with chance resemblance, especially when taking into consideration the statistic prevalence of nasal consonants in all the pronominal systems of the world. Zamponi found that Nichols's findings were distorted by her small sample size, and that some n–m languages were recent developments (though also that some languages had lost an ancestral n–m pattern), but he did find a statistical excess of the n–m pattern in western North America only. Looking at families rather than individual languages, he found a rate of 30% of families/protolanguages in North America, all on the western flank, compared to 5% in South America and 7% of non-American languages – though the percentage in North America, and especially the even higher number in the Pacific Northwest, drops considerably if Hokan and Penutian, or parts of them, are accepted as language families. If all the proposed Penutian and Hokan languages in the table below are related, then the frequency drops to 9% of North American families, statistically indistinguishable from the world average.

Below is a list of families with both 1sg n and 2sg m, though in some cases the evidence for one of the forms is weak.

Language families with 1sg N and 2sg M
Family		1sg	2sg
Penutian families
Proto-Tsimshianic		*nə	*mə [but also *-n]
Proto-Chinookan		*nai..., *n-	*mai..., *m-
Plateau Penutian	Klamath	ni I, ni-s my	mi-s you (object), mi your
Plateau Penutian	Molala	in- my, n- me	im- your, m- you (object)
Plateau Penutian	Proto-Sahaptian	*(ʔîꞏ-)n I	*(ʔîꞏ-)m you
Takelma		àn ~ -n, -àʔn ~ -ʔn	ma ~ maː
Cayuse		íniŋ, nǐs-	mǐs-
Proto-Maiduan		*ni I, *nik me, *nik-kʼi my	*mi you, *min you (obj), *min-kʼi your
Proto-Wintuan		*ni I, *ni-s me, *ne-r my, *ne-t my	*mi you, *mi-s (obj.), *mar your, *ma-t your
Yok- utian	Proto-Yokutsan	*naʔ I, *nan me, *nam ~ *nim my	*maʔ you, *man you (obj), *mam ~ *min your
Yok- utian	Proto-Utian	*kaꞏni I, *ka(ꞏ)na my	*miꞏ(n)
Proto-Huavean		*nV	*mɪ
Proto-Mixe-Zoquean		*n-heʔ mine, *n-	*mici, *min-
Hokan families
Chimariko		noʔot	mamot, m-, -m
Karok		náꞏ I, nani- ~ nini- my	ʔíꞏm you, mi- your
Coahuilteco		n(ami), n- ~ na-, nak-, niw-	mak-, may- ~ mi-
Proto-Yuman		*ʔnʸaː I, *nʸ-	*maː you, *m-
? Proto-Lencan		[*u(nani)], *-on ~ u(na)	*ama(nani), am-/ma-, -mi/-ma
Other North America
Karankawa		na-, n-	m-
Proto-Kiowa-Tanoan		*ną	*wįm
Proto-Uto-Aztecan		*(i)nɨ I, *(i)nɨ- my	*ɨ(mɨ) you, *ɨ(mɨ)- your
Proto-Chibchan		nasal *dã or *na	nasal *bã or *ma
South America
Proto-Guahiboan		*(xá-)ni, *-nV	*(xá-)mi
Proto-Aymaran		*na-ya I, *-Na my	*hu-ma you, *-ma you(r)
Mapuche		[iɲtʃé I], -(ɨ)n I, nyi my (also his/her)	eymi you, mi your, -m
? Puelche		nɨ-, -ɨn ~ -an	(kɨ-)ma-w, mu- ~ mɨ-
? Proto-Uru-Chipaya		(Chipaya only) -n	am
? Proto-Timotean		Timote-Cuica an, Mucuchí-Maripú unknown	Mucuchí-Maripú ma, Timote-Cuica ih

Other scattered families may have one or the other but not both.

Besides Proto-Eskaleut and Proto-Na–Dene, the families in North America with neither 1sg n or 2sg m are Atakapan, Chitimacha, Cuitlatec, Haida, Kutenai, Proto-Caddoan, Proto-Chimakuan, Proto-Comecrudan, Proto-Iroquoian, Proto-Muskogean, Proto-Siouan-Catawba, Tonkawa, Waikuri, Yana, Yuchi, Zuni.

== Other patterns ==
Other statistically significant patterns are more localized geographically, and so are less controversially associated with genuine language families, though chance resemblance may still play a role.

There are a number of neighboring families in South America that have a Č–Kw pattern. This has been interpreted as evidence that the languages are related in the Duho proposal, plus possibly Arutani–Sape. Similarly, an I–A pattern corresponds to the Macro-Jê proposal, including Fulnio and Chiquitano, but also to Matacoan, Zamucoan and Payaguá, which are not part of Macro-Jê.

In New Guinea, a widespread N–G pattern (where 'G' is typically /ŋɡ/) is taken to be diagnostic of the Trans–New Guinea family. However, the membership of Trans–New Guinea outside of core families is debatable.

In Australia, there are two widespread patterns: *ngay–*gu (/ŋai/–/ku/) and *ngay–*nginy (/ŋai/–/ŋiɲ/), with the latter found in Pama–Nyungan and both found in non-Pama–Nyungan families. This has been used to argue for a Proto-Australian language.
