= Historical linguistics =

Study of language change over time

Historical linguistics, also known as diachronic linguistics, is the scientific study of how languages change over time. It seeks to understand the nature and causes of linguistic change and to trace the evolution of languages. Historical linguistics involves several key areas of study, including the reconstruction of ancestral languages, the classification of languages into families (comparative linguistics), and the analysis of the cultural and social influences on language development.

This field is grounded in the uniformitarian principle, which posits that the processes of language change observed today were also at work in the past, unless there is clear evidence to suggest otherwise. Historical linguists aim to describe and explain changes in individual languages, explore the history of speech communities, and study the origins and meanings of words (etymology).

== Development ==
Modern historical linguistics dates to the late 18th century, having originally grown out of the earlier discipline of philology, the study of ancient texts and documents dating back to antiquity. Initially, historical linguistics served as the cornerstone of comparative linguistics, primarily as a tool for linguistic reconstruction. Scholars were concerned chiefly with establishing language families and reconstructing unrecorded proto-languages, using the comparative method and internal reconstruction. The focus was initially on the well-known Indo-European languages, many of which had long written histories; scholars also studied the Uralic languages, another Eurasian language-family for which less early written material exists. Since then, there has been significant comparative linguistic work expanding outside of European languages as well, such as on the Austronesian languages and on various families of Native American languages, among many others. Comparative linguistics became only a part of a more broadly-conceived discipline of historical linguistics. For the Indo-European languages, comparative study is now a highly specialized field.

Some scholars have undertaken studies attempting to establish super-families, linking, for example, Indo-European, Uralic, and other families into Nostratic. These attempts have not met with wide acceptance. The information necessary to establish relatedness becomes less available as the time increases. The time-depth of linguistic methods is limited due to chance word resemblances and variations between language groups, but a limit of around 10,000 years is often assumed. Several methods are used to date proto-languages, but the process is generally difficult and its results are inherently approximate.

== Diachronic and synchronic analysis ==
In linguistics, a synchronic analysis is one that views linguistic phenomena only at a given time, usually the present, but a synchronic analysis of a historical language form is also possible. It may be distinguished from diachronic, which regards a phenomenon in terms of developments through time. Diachronic analysis is the main concern of historical linguistics. However, most other branches of linguistics are concerned with some form of synchronic analysis. The study of language change offers a valuable insight into the state of linguistic representation, and because all synchronic forms are the result of historically evolving diachronic changes, the ability to explain linguistic constructions necessitates a focus on diachronic processes.

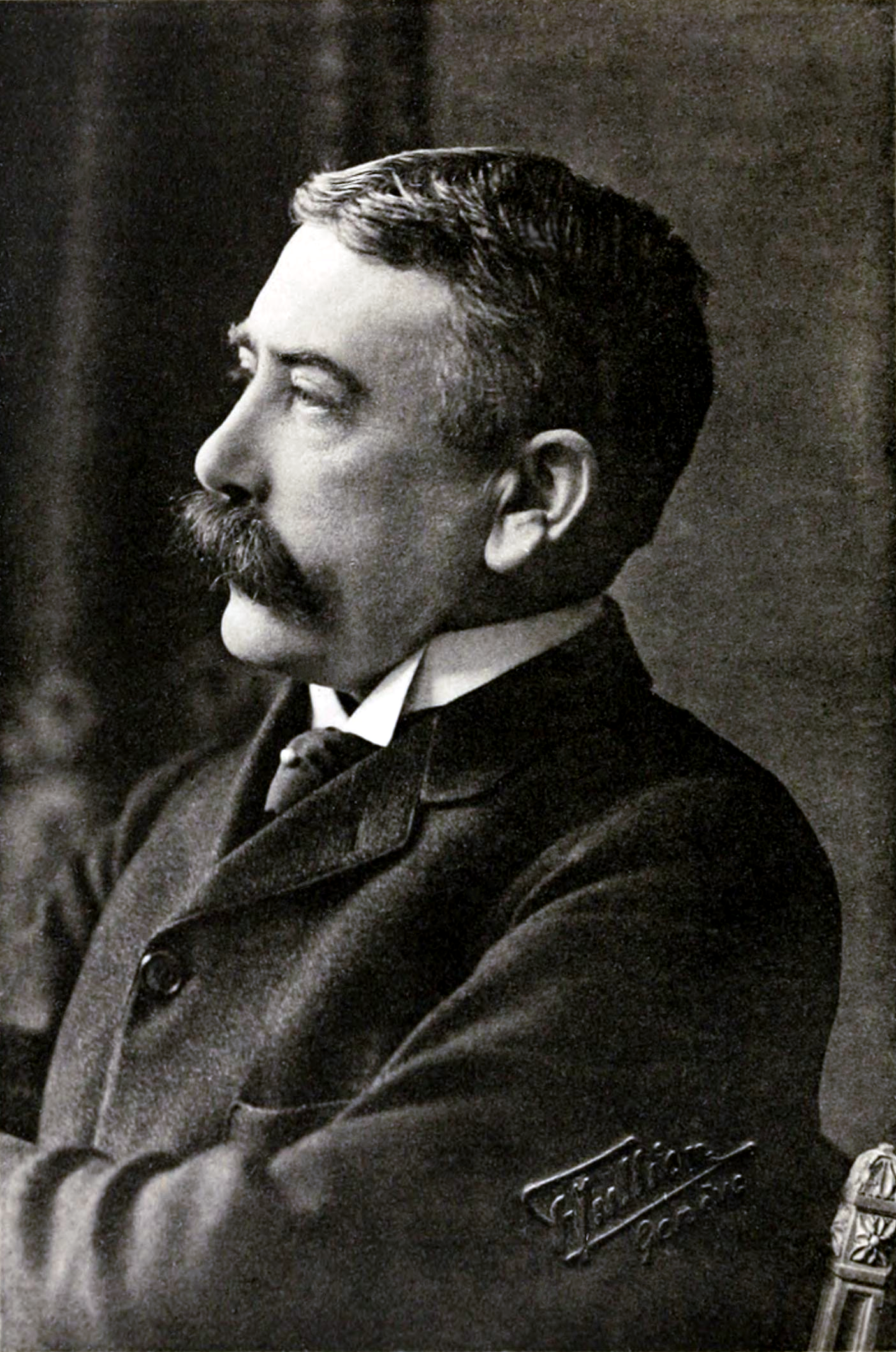
Swiss linguist Ferdinand de Saussure

Initially, all of modern linguistics was historical in orientation. Even the study of modern dialects involved looking at their origins. Ferdinand de Saussure's distinction between synchronic and diachronic linguistics is fundamental to the present day organization of the discipline. Primacy is accorded to synchronic linguistics, and diachronic linguistics is defined as the study of successive synchronic stages. Saussure's clear demarcation, however, has had both defenders and critics.

In practice, a purely-synchronic linguistics is not possible for any period before the invention of the gramophone, as written records always lag behind speech in reflecting linguistic developments. Written records are difficult to date accurately before the development of the modern title page. Often, dating must rely on contextual historical evidence such as inscriptions, or modern technology, such as carbon dating, can be used to ascertain dates of varying accuracy. Also, the work of sociolinguists on linguistic variation has shown synchronic states are not uniform: the speech habits of older and younger speakers differ in ways that point to language change. Synchronic variation is linguistic change in progress.

Synchronic and diachronic approaches can reach quite different conclusions. For example, a Germanic strong verb (e.g. English sing ↔ sang ↔ sung) is irregular when it is viewed synchronically: the native speaker's brain processes them as learned forms, but the derived forms of regular verbs are processed quite differently, by the application of productive rules (for example, adding -ed to the basic form of a verb as in walk → walked). That is an insight of psycholinguistics, which is relevant also for language didactics, both of which are synchronic disciplines. However, a diachronic analysis shows that the strong verb is the remnant of a fully regular system of internal vowel changes, in this case the Indo-European ablaut; historical linguistics seldom uses the category "irregular verb".

The principal tools of research in diachronic linguistics are the comparative method and the method of internal reconstruction. Less-standard techniques, such as mass lexical comparison, are used by some linguists to overcome the limitations of the comparative method, but most linguists regard them as unreliable. The findings of historical linguistics are often used as a basis for hypotheses about the groupings and movements of peoples, particularly in the prehistoric period. In practice, however, it is often unclear how to integrate the linguistic evidence with the archaeological or genetic evidence. For example, there are numerous theories concerning the homeland and early movements of the Proto-Indo-Europeans, each with its own interpretation of the archaeological record.

== Comparative linguistics ==
Classification of Indo-European languages. Red: Extinct languages. White: categories or unattested proto-languages. Left half: centum languages; right half: satem languages

Comparative linguistics, originally comparative philology, is a branch of historical linguistics that is concerned with comparing languages in order to establish their historical relatedness. Languages may be related by convergence through borrowing or by genetic descent, thus languages can change and are also able to cross-relate. Genetic relatedness implies a common origin among languages. Comparative linguists construct language families, reconstruct proto-languages, and analyze the historical changes that have resulted in the documented languages' divergences.

== Etymology ==
Etymology studies the history of words: when they entered a language, from what source, and how their form and meaning have changed over time. Words may enter a language in several ways, including being borrowed as loanwords from another language, being derived by combining pre-existing elements in the language, by a hybrid known as phono-semantic matching.

In languages with a long and detailed history, etymology makes use of philology, the study of how words change from culture to culture over time. Etymologists also apply the methods of comparative linguistics to reconstruct information about languages that are too old for any direct information (such as writing) to be known. By analysis of related languages by the comparative method, linguists can make inferences about their shared parent language and its vocabulary. In that way, word roots that can be traced all the way back to the origin of, for instance, the Indo-European language family have been found. Although originating in the philological tradition, much current etymological research is done in language families for which little or no early documentation is available, such as Uralic and Austronesian.

== Dialectology ==
Dialectology is the scientific study of linguistic dialect, the varieties of a language that are characteristic of particular groups, based primarily on geographic distribution and their associated features. This is in contrast to variations based on social factors, which are studied in sociolinguistics, or variations based on time, which are studied in historical linguistics. Dialectology treats such topics as divergence of two local dialects from a common ancestor and synchronic variation.

Dialectologists are concerned with grammatical features that correspond to regional areas. Thus, they are usually dealing with populations living in specific locales for generations without moving, but also with immigrant groups bringing their languages to new settlements. Immigrant groups often bring their linguistic practices to new settlements, leading to distinct linguistic varieties within those communities. Dialectologists analyze these immigrant dialects to understand how languages develop and diversify in response to migration and cultural interactions.

== Phonology ==
Phonology is a sub-field of linguistics which studies the sound system of a specific language or set of languages. Whereas phonetics is about the physical production and perception of the sounds of speech, phonology describes the way sounds function within a given language or across languages. Phonology studies when sounds are or are not treated as distinct within a language. For example, the p in pin is aspirated, but the p in spin is not. In English these two sounds are used in complementary distribution and are not used to differentiate words so they are considered allophones of the same phoneme. In some other languages like Thai and Quechua, the same difference of aspiration or non-aspiration differentiates words and so the two sounds, or phones, are considered to be distinct phonemes. In addition to the minimal meaningful sounds (the phonemes), phonology studies how sounds alternate, such as the /p/ in English, and topics such as syllable structure, stress, accent, and intonation.

Principles of phonology have also been applied to the analysis of sign languages, but the phonological units do not consist of sounds. The principles of phonological analysis can be applied independently of modality because they are designed to serve as general analytical tools, not language-specific ones.

== Morphology and syntax ==
Morphology is the study of patterns of word-formation within a language. It attempts to formulate rules that model the knowledge of speakers. In the context of historical linguistics, formal means of expression change over time. Words as units in the lexicon are the subject matter of lexicology. Along with clitics, words are generally accepted to be the smallest units of syntax; however, it is clear in most languages that words may be related to one another by rules. These rules are understood by the speaker, and reflect specific patterns in how word formation interacts with speech. In the context of historical linguistics, the means of expression change over time.

Syntax is the study of the principles and rules for constructing sentences in natural languages. Syntax directly concerns the rules and principles that govern sentence structure in individual languages. Researchers attempt to describe languages in terms of these rules. Many historical linguistics attempt to compare changes in sentence between related languages, or find universal grammar rules that natural languages follow regardless of when and where they are spoken.

== Evolutionary context ==
In terms of evolutionary theory, historical linguistics (as opposed to research into the origin of language) studies Lamarckian acquired characteristics of languages. This perspective explores how languages adapt and change over time in response to cultural, societal, and environmental factors. Language evolution within the framework of historical linguistics is akin to Lamarckism in the sense that linguistic traits acquired during an individual's lifetime can potentially influence subsequent generations of speakers.

=== Rate of adaptation ===
Historical linguists often use the terms conservative and innovative to describe the extent of change within a language variety relative to that of comparable varieties. Conservative languages change less over time when compared to innovative languages.

== See also ==
- Etymological dictionary
- Genetic linguistics
- Glottochronology
- Historical dictionary
- Lexicostatistics
- List of ancestor languages
- List of languages by first written accounts
- List of proto-languages
- Mass lexical comparison
- Paleolinguistics
- Real-time sociolinguistics
- Wave model
