= PTM =

PTM may refer to:

== Science and technology ==
- Polynomial texture mapping, a digital imaging technique
- Post-translational modification, covalent and generally enzymatic modification of proteins following protein biosynthesis by ribosomes
- Post-transition metal, a grouping of chemical elements
- Probabilistic Turing machine, in theoretical computer science
- Pulse time modulation, a pulse modulation method

== Other uses ==
- Parent–teacher meeting, a meeting of parents with teachers to discuss the progress of school students
- President's Tatrakshak Medal, a military decoration of the Indian Coast Guard
- Pashtun Tahafuz Movement, a human rights movement in Pakistan for the Pashtun people
- Polygyny threshold model, a theory explaining polygyny
- Portugal. The Man, an American rock band
- Proto-Tungus–Manchu, another name for the Proto-Tungusic language
