= A priori and a posteriori =

Two types of knowledge, justification, or argument

In epistemology, a priori (‘from the earlier’) and a posteriori (‘from the later’) are the two categories of knowledge, justification, or argument, determining whether or not a proposition is reliant on outside sensory experience. Roughly speaking, a proposition is known or justified a priori if it is known or justified independently of any experience (beyond the experience necessary to understand the proposition). It is known or justified a posteriori if its knowledge and/or justification depends on empirical evidence. For example, the proposition ‘It is sunny in London today’ can be known (if true) a posteriori, whereas the proposition ‘Either it is sunny or it is not sunny in London today’ can be known a priori.

Fields of knowledge where a priori justification is predominant are, for example, mathematics and formal logic; by contrast, most of the sciences generally involve a posteriori justification. In the history of philosophy, the a priori–a posteriori distinction first appeared in the writings of the 14th century logician Albert of Saxony, where the phrases were used to distinguish between arguments ‘from causes to effects’ (a priori) and ‘from effects to causes’ (a posteriori). As an epistemological distinction it became prominent with Immanuel Kant's Critique of Pure Reason, where its relation to the analytic–synthetic distinction is discussed.

In linguistics and language construction, the two terms describe if linguistic content – primarily vocabulary – is derived from any preexisting languages or not.

== Examples ==
Consider the proposition: "If George V reigned at least four days, then he reigned more than three days." This is an a priori statement, as the fact that four is greater than three can be known through reason alone.

In contrast, consider the proposition: "George V reigned from 1910 to 1936." This is something that (if true) one must come to know a posteriori because it expresses a historical fact reliant on empirical evidence of the real-life figure, and therefore unknowable by reason alone.

== Aprioricity, analyticity and necessity ==
=== Relation to the analytic–synthetic distinction ===
Several philosophers, in reaction to Immanuel Kant, sought to explain a priori knowledge without appealing to what Paul Boghossian describes as "a special faculty [intuition] ... that has never been described in satisfactory terms." One theory, popular among the logical positivists of the early 20th century, is what Boghossian calls the "analytic explanation of the a priori". The distinction between analytic and synthetic propositions was first introduced by Kant. While his original distinction was primarily drawn in terms of conceptual containment, the contemporary version of such distinction primarily involves, as American philosopher Willard Van Orman Quine put it, the notions of "true by virtue of meanings and independently of fact."

Analytic propositions are considered true by virtue of their meaning alone, while a posteriori propositions by virtue of their meaning and of certain facts about the world. According to the analytic explanation of the a priori, all a priori knowledge is analytic; so a priori knowledge need not require a special faculty of pure intuition, since it can be accounted for simply by one's ability to understand the meaning of the proposition in question. More simply, proponents of this explanation claimed to have reduced a dubious metaphysical faculty of pure reason to a legitimate linguistic notion of analyticity.

The analytic explanation of a priori knowledge has undergone several criticisms. Most notably, Quine argues that the analytic–synthetic distinction is illegitimate:

But for all its a priori reasonableness, a boundary between analytic and synthetic statements simply has not been drawn. That there is such a distinction to be drawn at all is an unempirical dogma of empiricists, a metaphysical article of faith.

Although the soundness of Quine's proposition remains uncertain, it had a powerful effect on the project of explaining the a priori in terms of the analytic.

=== Relation to the necessary truths and contingent truths ===
The metaphysical distinction between necessary and contingent truths has also been related to a priori and a posteriori knowledge.

A proposition that is necessarily true is one in which its negation is self-contradictory; it is true in every possible world. For example, considering the proposition "all bachelors are unmarried:" its negation (i.e. the proposition that some bachelors are married) is incoherent due to the concept of being unmarried (or the meaning of the word "unmarried") being tied to part of the concept of being a bachelor (or part of the definition of the word "bachelor"). To the extent that contradictions are impossible, self-contradictory propositions are necessarily false as it is impossible for them to be true. The negation of a self-contradictory proposition is, therefore, supposed to be necessarily true.

By contrast, a proposition that is contingently true is one in which its negation is not self-contradictory. Thus, it is said not to be true in every possible world. As Jason Baehr suggests, it seems plausible that all necessary propositions are known a priori, because "[s]ense experience can tell us only about the actual world and hence about what is the case; it can say nothing about what must or must not be the case."

Following Kant, some philosophers have considered the relationship between aprioricity, analyticity, and necessity to be extremely close. According to Jerry Fodor, "positivism, in particular, took it for granted that a priori truths must be necessary." Since Kant, the distinction between analytic and synthetic propositions has slightly changed. Analytic propositions were largely taken to be "true by virtue of meanings and independently of fact", while synthetic propositions were not—one must conduct some sort of empirical investigation, looking to the world, to determine the truth-value of synthetic propositions.

=== Separation ===
Aprioricity, analyticity and necessity have since been more clearly separated from each other. American philosopher Saul Kripke (1972), for example, provides strong arguments against this position, whereby he contends that there are necessary a posteriori truths. For example, the proposition that water is H_{2}O (if it is true): According to Kripke, this statement is both necessarily true, because water and H_{2}O are the same thing, they are identical in every possible world, and truths of identity are logically necessary; and a posteriori, because it is known only through empirical investigation. Following such considerations of Kripke and others (see Hilary Putnam), philosophers tend to distinguish the notion of aprioricity more clearly from that of necessity and analyticity.

Kripke's definitions of these terms diverge in subtle ways from Kant's. Taking these differences into account, Kripke's controversial analysis of naming as contingent and a priori would, according to Stephen Palmquist, best fit into Kant's epistemological framework by calling it "analytic a posteriori." (Note: In this pair of articles, Stephen Palmquist demonstrates that the context often determines how a particular proposition should be classified. A proposition that is synthetic a posteriori in one context might be analytic a priori in another. (Palmquist 1987b, pp. 269, 273)) Aaron Sloman presented a brief defence of Kant's three distinctions (analytic/synthetic, apriori/empirical and necessary/contingent), in that it did not assume "possible world semantics" for the third distinction, merely that some part of this world might have been different.

The relationship between aprioricity, necessity and analyticity is not easy to discern. Most philosophers at least seem to agree that while the various distinctions may overlap, the notions are clearly not identical: the a priori/a posteriori distinction is epistemological; the analytic/synthetic distinction is linguistic; and the necessary/contingent distinction is metaphysical.

== History ==
=== Early uses ===
The term a priori is Latin for 'from what comes before' (or, less literally, 'from first principles, before experience'). In contrast, the term a posteriori is Latin for 'from what comes later' (or 'after experience').

They appear in Latin translations of Euclid's Elements, a work widely considered during the early European modern period as the model for precise thinking.

An early philosophical use of what might be considered a notion of a priori knowledge (though not called by that name) is Plato's theory of recollection, related in the dialogue Meno, according to which something like a priori knowledge is knowledge inherent, intrinsic in the human mind.

Albert of Saxony, a 14th-century logician, wrote on both a priori and a posteriori.

The early modern Thomistic philosopher John Sergeant differentiates the terms by the direction of inference regarding proper causes and effects. To demonstrate something a priori is to "Demonstrate Proper Effects from Proper Efficient Causes" and likewise to demonstrate a posteriori is to demonstrate "Proper Efficient Causes from Proper Effects", according to his 1696 work The Method to Science Book III, Lesson IV, Section 7.

G. W. Leibniz introduced a distinction between a priori and a posteriori criteria for the possibility of a notion in his short treatise "Meditations on Knowledge, Truth, and Ideas" (1684). A priori and a posteriori arguments for the existence of God appear in his Monadology (1714).

George Berkeley outlined the distinction in his 1710 work A Treatise Concerning the Principles of Human Knowledge (para. XXI).

=== Immanuel Kant ===
The 18th-century German philosopher Immanuel Kant (1781) advocated a blend of rationalist and empiricist theories. Kant says, "Although all our cognition begins with experience, it does not follow that it arises from [is caused by] experience." According to Kant, a priori cognition is transcendental, or based on the form of all possible experience, while a posteriori cognition is empirical, based on the content of experience:

It is quite possible that our empirical knowledge is a compound of that which we receive through impressions, and that which the faculty of cognition supplies from itself sensuous impressions [sense data] giving merely the occasion [opportunity for a cause to produce its effect].

Contrary to contemporary usages of the term, Kant believes that a priori knowledge is not entirely independent of the content of experience. Unlike the rationalists, Kant thinks that a priori cognition, in its pure form, that is without the admixture of any empirical content, is limited to the deduction of the conditions of possible experience. These a priori, or transcendental, conditions are seated in one's cognitive faculties, and are not provided by experience in general or any experience in particular (although an argument exists that a priori intuitions can be "triggered" by experience).

Kant nominated and explored the possibility of a transcendental logic with which to consider the deduction of the a priori in its pure form. Space, time and causality are considered pure a priori intuitions. Kant reasoned that the pure a priori intuitions are established via his transcendental aesthetic and transcendental logic. He claimed that the human subject would not have the kind of experience that it has were these a priori forms not in some way constitutive of him as a human subject. For instance, a person would not experience the world as an orderly, rule-governed place unless time, space and causality were determinant functions in the form of perceptual faculties, i. e., there can be no experience in general without space, time or causality as particular determinants thereon. The claim is more formally known as Kant's transcendental deduction and it is the central argument of his major work, the Critique of Pure Reason. The transcendental deduction argues that time, space and causality are ideal as much as real. In consideration of a possible logic of the a priori, this most famous of Kant's deductions has made the successful attempt in the case for the fact of subjectivity, what constitutes subjectivity and what relation it holds with objectivity and the empirical.

=== Johann Fichte ===
After Kant's death, a number of philosophers saw themselves as correcting and expanding his philosophy, leading to the various forms of German Idealism. One of these philosophers was Johann Fichte. His student (and critic), Arthur Schopenhauer, accused him of rejecting the distinction between a priori and a posteriori knowledge:

... Fichte who, because the thing-in-itself had just been discredited, at once prepared a system without any thing-in-itself. Consequently, he rejected the assumption of anything that was not through and through merely our representation, and therefore let the knowing subject be all in all or at any rate produce everything from its own resources. For this purpose, he at once did away with the essential and most meritorious part of the Kantian doctrine, the distinction between a priori and a posteriori and thus that between the phenomenon and the thing-in-itself. For he declared everything to be a priori, naturally without any evidence for such a monstrous assertion; instead of these, he gave sophisms and even crazy sham demonstrations whose absurdity was concealed under the mask of profundity and of the incomprehensibility ostensibly arising therefrom. Moreover, he appealed boldly and openly to intellectual intuition, that is, really to inspiration.

— Schopenhauer, Parerga and Paralipomena, Vol. I, §13

== Linguistics ==
Many conlangs and some natural registers make use of nonsense words or other morphemes created through pure invention, based only on the available phonology of a language. In contrast, most natural languages and international auxiliary languages instead draw on a preexisting ancestor language or stratum as part of the etymology of a word.

A priori languages include Klingon, aUI, and Solresol. A posteriori languages include Esperanto, Lingwa de Planeta, and Toki Pona.

== See also ==
- A priori probability
- A posteriori necessity
- Ab initio
- Abductive reasoning
- Abstract and concrete
- Analytic–synthetic distinction
- Deductive reasoning
- Inductive reasoning
- Off the verandah
- Relativized a priori
- Tabula rasa
- Transcendental empiricism
- Transcendental hermeneutic phenomenology
- Transcendental nominalism
- Vorstellung
