= List of ancestor languages =

This is a list of ancestor languages of modern and ancient languages, detailed for each modern language or its phylogenetic ancestor disappeared. For each language, the list is generally limited to the four or five immediate predecessors.

== Afro-Asiatic languages ==
Modern languages

- Modern Arabic < Classical Arabic (7th–10th century AD) < Old Arabic (5th century BC – 6th AD) < Proto-Arabic < Central Proto-Semitic
- Coptic (3rd–17th century) < Egyptian demotic (4th BC – 1st century AD) < Late Ancient Egyptian (c. 1350–700 BC) < Classical Egyptian (c. 2000–1350 BC) < Archaic Egyptian (3300–2000 BC)
- Modern Hebrew (19th- ) < Rabbinic Hebrew (s. I-6th d.C.) < Classical Hebrew (10th–1st century BC) < Proto-Canaanite < Northwestern Proto-Semitic < Central Proto-Semitic

== Altaic, Koreanic and Japonic languages ==
Modern languages

- Japanese < Middle Japanese (12th–17th century) < Old Japanese (8th–11th century) < Proto-Japonic
- Korean < Middle Korean (9th–17th century) < Old Korean (6th–10th century) < Proto-Korean
- Manchu < Jurchen (12th–17th century)
- Modern Mongolian < Classical Mongolian (17th–19th century) < Middle Mongol (12th–16th century) < Proto-Mongolic
- Modern Turkish < Ottoman Turkish (16th–19th century) < Old Anatolian Turkish (11th–15th century)

== Austroasiatic languages ==
- Khmer (Cambodian) < Middle Khmer (14th–18th century) < Old Khmer (7th–13th century) < Proto-Khmer (6th century)
- Modern Vietnamese Middle Vietnamese < (17–19th century) < Old Vietnamese (10–16th century) < Proto-Vietnamese (7th–9th century)

== Indo-European languages ==
Modern European languages

- Modern Danish < Old Danish (12th–16th century) < Old East Norse (8th–12th century) < Proto-Nordic (3rd–7th century)
- Modern Dutch < Middle Dutch (12th–16th century) < Old Dutch (8th–11th century) < Old Franconian (3rd–7th century)
- Modern English < Middle English (12th–16th century) < Anglo-Saxon (6th–11th century) < Proto-Anglo-Frisian (3rd–6th century AD)
- Modern French < Middle French (14th–17th century) < Old French (9th–14th century) < Proto-Gallo-Romance (6th–7th century)
- Modern German < Middle High German (12th–14th century) < Old High German (6th–11th century) < Proto-High Germanic (c. 3rd–5th century)
- Modern Greek < medieval Greek (7th–16th century) < Hellenistic Greek (3rd century BC – 6th AD) < (8th–3rd century BC)
- Modern Irish < Middle Irish (s. 11th–13th) < Old Irish (6th–10th century) < Primitive Irish (3rd-6th century) < proto-Goidelic
- Modern Italian < Tuscan (13th–18th century) < Old Tuscan < Proto-Italoromance (6th–8th century)
- Modern Norwegian < Old Norwegian (12th–16th century) < West Old Norse (8th–12th century) < Proto-Norse (3rd–7th century)
- Modern Polish < Old Polish (10th–16th century) < Proto-Lechitic
- Portuguese < Early Portuguese < Galician-Portuguese (9th–15th century) < proto-Ibero-Romance (c. 6th–8th century)
- Modern Romanian < Middle Romanian < (13th–17th century) < Common Romanian (7th–12th century)
- Modern Russian < Middle Russian (15th–17th century) < Old Russian (11th–14th century) < Old East Slavic < Proto-East Slavic
- Modern Spanish < Middle Spanish (15th–17th century) < Old Spanish (9th–15th century) < proto-Ibero-Romance (c. 6th–8th) < late Latin (s. 3rd–6th AD)
- Modern Swedish < Old Swedish (12th–16th century) < East Old Norse (8th–12th century) < Proto-Norse (3rd–7th century)
- Modern Welsh < Middle Welsh (16th–13th century) < Old Welsh (7th–12th century) < Common Brittonic

Languages of the Near East and India

- Modern Assamese < Early Assamese (14th–16th century) < Eastern Apabhraṃśa (7th–13th century) < Maghadi Prakrit
- Modern Bengali < Middle Bengali (13th–16th century) < Eastern Apabhraṃśa (7th–13th century) < Maghadi Prakrit
- Farsi (modern Persian) < Classical Persian (10th–18th century) < Pahlavi (3rd–8th century AD) < Old Persian (6th–2nd century BC)
- Gujarati < Middle Gujarati < Old Gujarati (8th–14th century) < Gurjar Apabhraṃśa (3rd–8th century) < Old Prakrit (3rd BC–2nd AD)
- Modern Hindi < khariboli (13th–16th century) < Shauraseni (3rd–10th century) < Prakrit (s. 3rd a.C. –2nd AD)
- Konkani < Jain Apabhraṃśa < Jain Apabhraṃśa < Maharashtri Prakrit (5th century BC- 10th century AD)
- Marathi < Maharashtri Prakrit (5th century BC – 10th century AD)
- Rajasthani < Middle Rajasthani < Old Gujarati (8th–14th century) < Gurjar Apabhraṃśa (3rd–8th century) < Old Prakrit (3rd BC – 2nd AD)

Ancient languages

- Gothic (3rd–10th century AD) < East Proto-Germanic (4th century BC – 2nd AD)
- Ancient Greek (8th–3rd century BC) < Mycenaean Greek (16th–12th century BC) < Proto-Hellenic (c. 1800 BC)
- Classical Latin (first century BC. -s. 3rd AD) < archaic Latin (s. 7th BC -I BC) < Proto-Italic language (c. 1500 BC) < Proto-Italo-Celtic (c. 3100 BC)
- Classical Sanskrit < Vedic Sanskrit < Proto-Indo-Aryan < Proto-Indo-Iranian

== Indigenous languages of the Americas ==
- Língua geral < Old Tupi (14th–16th century) < Proto-Tupi-Guarani
- Modern Nahuatl < Classical Nahuatl (14th–16th century) < proto-Nahuan
- Quechua < classical Quechua (14th–16th century) < Proto-Quechuan

== Sino-Tibetan languages ==
Modern languages

- Modern Burmese < Old Burmese (12th–16th century) < Proto-Burmic
- Modern Standard Chinese < early Mandarin (12th–14th century) < Medieval Chinese (4th–12th century) < Late Han Chinese (2nd century BC – 3rd AD) < Ancient Chinese (8th–3rd century BC)
- Modern Tibetan < Classical Tibetan (12th–17th century) < proto-Tibetic

Ancient languages

- Old Chinese (8th–3rd century BC) < Archaic Chinese (13th–8th century BC) < Proto-Sinitic

== Uralic languages ==
- Modern Finnish < Early Finnish (13th–17th century) < Proto-Finnic
- Modern Hungarian < Old Hungarian (10th–15th century) < Proto-Ugric

== Other languages ==
- Basque < Old Aquitanian
