= Proto-Mienic language =

Reconstructed ancestor of the Mienic languages

Proto-Mienic
- Proto-Yao
- Reconstruction of: Mienic languages
- Reconstructed ancestor: Proto-Hmong–Mien

Proto-Mienic or Proto-Yao (Chinese: 原始瑶语) is the reconstructed ancestor of the Mienic languages.

== Reconstructions ==
Reconstructions of Proto-Mienic (Proto-Yao) include those of Purnell (1970), L-Thongkum (1993), Ratliff (2010), and Liu (2021).

Purnell (1970) and L-Thongkum (1993) do not include any data from the divergent Biao Min and Zao Min languages. Purnell's (1970) Proto-Yao reconstruction is based on Iu Mien (Chiengrai [Chiang Rai, in Hwei Kang Pa ห้วยก้างปลา], Hsing-an [Xing'an], and Taipan [Đại Bản 大板] dialects) and Kim Mun (Haininh [Quảng Ninh] and Ling-chun [Lingchuan] dialects).

Liu's (2021) Proto-Yao reconstruction is based on data from Iu Mien (Jiangdi 江底 and Miaoziyuan 庙子源 dialects), Biao Mwan (Luoxiang 罗香), Kim Mun (Liangzi 梁子 and Tansan 滩散 dialects), Biao Min (Dongshan 东山 and Shikou 石口 dialects), and Zao Min (Daping 大坪). More than 500 lexical items are reconstructed.

== Phonology ==
=== Consonants ===
Liu (2021:78-80) gives the following consonant inventory for Proto-Mienic.

Proto-Mienic consonants
	Labial	Alveolar	Palatal	Velar	Glottal
Stop, voiceless	p	t	c	k	ʔ
Stop, voiced	b	d	ɟ		
Affricate, voiceless		ts			
Affricate, voiced		dz			
Nasal	m	n	ɲ	ŋ	
Fricative, voiceless		s		x	h
Fricative, voiced				ɣ	ɦ
Approximant	w	l	j		
Rhotic		r			

Initial consonants can be preglottalized, aspirated, or devoiced. Final consonants include /-p, -t, -k, -m, -n, -ŋ/.

==== Proposed velarization ====
Ostapirat (2016) proposes velarized initials in Proto-Mienic, which are not reconstructed by Liu (2021), Ratliff (2010), and others. Below is a comparison of selected Proto-Mienic reconstructions with initial bilabial stops from Ostapirat (2016), Liu (2021), L-Thongkum (1993) ("Pre-Mjuenic" reconstructions), and Ratliff (2010).

Gloss	Ostapirat (2016)	Liu (2021)	L-Thongkum (1993)	Ratliff (2010)
full, satisfied	*peu^{B}	*pwɔŋ^{3}	*pwɔŋ^{B}	pHM *pu̯ɛŋ^{X}
fruit	*pˠeu^{B}	*pjiɔu^{3}	*piəu^{B}	pHM *pji̯əu^{X}
float	*mbˠeu^{A}	*mbliɔu^{2}	*mbiəu^{A} > *biəu^{A2}	*mbi̯əu^{A}
bedbug	*pˠi^{A}	*pji^{1}	–	pHM *pji
three	*pˠu^{A}	*pwɔu^{1}	*puə^{A}	pHM *pjɔu
burn	*pˠu^{B}	*pwɔu^{3}	*puə^{B}	*pɔu^{B}
name	*mpˠu^{C}	*ʔbwɔu^{5}	*ʔbuə^{C} > *buə^{C1}	pHM *mpɔu^{H}
hand	*bˠu^{B}	*bwɔu^{4}	*buə^{B} > *puə^{B2}	pHM *-bɔu^{X}

=== Vowels ===
Liu (2021:165) reconstructs 8 Proto-Mienic vowels.

	Front	Back
High	i	u
Mid-high	e	o
Mid-low	ɛ	ɔ
Near-low	æ	
Low	a	

*ɛ only occurs as part of the rimes *-ɛːŋ and *-ɛk.

Liu (2021) reconstructs contrastive vowel length for Proto-Mienic. However, L-Thongkum (1993) and Ratliff (2010) do not reconstruct vowel length for Proto-Mienic, as they consider vowel length in synchronic Mienic languages to be later prosodic developments.

== Sound correspondences ==
Sound correspondences among the Mienic languages from Liu (2021):

=== Initials ===
Reflexes of Proto-Mienic initials in synchronic Mienic languages are as follows (Liu 2021). Prenasalized Pre-Mienic initials are reconstructed; these developed into certain preglottalized and aspirated Proto-Mienic initials.

Proto-Mienic	Pre-Mienic	Jiangdi Mien	Miaoziyuan Mien	Luoxiang Mien	Liangzi Mun	Tansan Mun	Dongshan Biao Min	Shikou Biao Min	Daping Dzao Min
*p		p	p	p	p	ʔp	p	b	b
*pʰ		pʰ	pʰ	pʰ	pʰ	pʰ	pʰ	pʰ	p
*b		p	p	p	p	ʔp	p	b	p
*ʔb	*mp	b	b	b	b	b	b	p	b
*bʰ	*mpʰ	b	b	b	b	b	b	b	b
*mb		b	b	b	b	b	b	p	b
*ʔm		m	m	m	m	m	m	m	m
*hm		m̥	m̥	m̥	m	m̥	m̥	m	m
*ʔw		w	w	w	w	v	w	v	v
*w		w	w	v	w	v	w	v	v
*pw		pw	pw	p	p	ʔp	p	b	b
*bw		pw	pw	p	p	ʔp	p	p	p
*ʔbw	*mpw	bw	bw	bw	b	b	b	pw	b
*bʰw	*mpʰw	bw	bw	b	b	b	b	b	b
*mbw		bw	bw	bw	b	b	b	p	b
*hmw		mw	mw	m	m	m	m̥	m	m
*mw		mw	mw	mw	m	m	m	m	m
*pj		pj	pj	pj	pj	ʔpj	pj	bj	b
*bj		pj	pj	pw	f	f	pj	b	pj
*ʔbj	*mpj	bj	bj	b	b	b	b	b	b
*bʰj	*mpʰj	bj	bj	bw	v	b	bj	b	bj
*hmj		mj	mj	m̥w	m	m	m̥j	m	mj
*mj		mj	mj	mw	m	m	m	m	m
*ʔwj		wj	wj	v	w	v	w	ʔ	vj
*wj		wj	wj	w	w	v	w	v	vj
*pl		pj	p	pj	pj	ʔpj	pl	pl	pj
*mbl		bj	b	bj	bj	bj	bl	pl	b
*t		t	t	t	t	ʔt	t	d	d
*tʰ		tʰ	tʰ	tʰ	tʰ	tʰ	tʰ	tʰ	h
*d		t	t	t	t	ʔt	t	d	t
*ʔd		d	d	d	d	d	d	t	d
*dʰ	*ntʰ	d	d	d	d	d	d	d	d
*nd		d	d	d	d	d	d	t	d
*ʔn		n	n	n	n	n	n	n	n
*hn		n̥	n̥	n̥	n	n	n̥	n	n
*n		n	n	n	n	n	n	n	n
*s		f	f	θ	tθ	θ	s	s	h
*sʰ		s	s	ɕ	tθ	θ	s	s	h
*tw		tw	tw	tw	t	ʔt	tw	d	d
*dw		d	dw	d	d	d	dw	tw	d
*ʔdw	*ntw	d	d	d	d	d	dw	tw	d
*sw		f	f	θ	tθ	θ	sw	sj	h
*sʰw		s	s	ɕ	tθ	θ	sw	sj	h
*ʔdj	*ntj	dj	dj	d	d	d	t	d	d
*sʰj		sj	sj	ɕ	s	ɕ	s	ɕ	sj
*ʔl		l	l	l	l	l	l	l	l
*ʔlj		lj	lj	l	lj	lj	lj	lj	lj
*hl		ɬ	l	l	l	l	ɬ	l	l
*hlj		ɬ	ɬ	l̥	l	l	ɬ	lj	lj
*l		l	l	l	l	l	l	l	l
*ʔr		l	l	g	g	g	l	l	dz
*ʔrj		l	l	g	gj	gj	l	l	dz
*hr		ɬ	ɬ	g	g	g	ɬ	l	dz
*hrj		ɬj	ɬj	gj	gj	gj	ɬj	lj	dz
*r		l	l	g	g	g	l	l	dz
*rj		l	l	g	gj	gj	l	l	dz
*ts		ts	ts	θ	tθ	θ	ts	ts	t
*tsʰ		tsʰ	tsʰ	θ	t	tʰ	tɕʰ	tsʰj	h
*dz		ts	ts	θ	tθ	tθ	ts	ts	h
*ʔdz		dz	dz	d	d	d	dz	ts	dz
*dzʰ	*ntsʰ	dz	dz	d	d	d	dz	tʰ	d
*ndz		dz	dz	d	d	d	dz	ts	d
*tsw		tsw	tsw	θw	tθ	θ	tsw	ts	t
*dzw		tsw	tsw	θw	tθ	tθ	tsw	ts	h
*ʔdzw	*ntsw	dʑw	dʑw	j	ȡ	ȡ	ȡ	tɕ	g
*tsj		tsj	tsj	tɕ	s	ɕ	ȶ	tɕ	ts
*tsʰj		tsʰj	tsʰj	θj	tj	kʰj	tsʰ	tsʰ	h
*dzj		tsj	tsj	tɕ	s	ɕ	ȶʰ	tɕ	sj
*ʔdzj	*ntsj	dzj	dzj	dʑ	ȡ	ȡ	hj	j	dz
*dzʰj	*ntsʰj	dzj	dzj	dʑ	ȡ	ȡ	ȡ	tɕʰ	dzj
*ndzj		dzj	dzj	dʑ	ȡ	ȡ	tɕ	tɕ	h
*c		ts	ts	tɕ	ȶ	ȶ	ȶ	tɕ	ts
*cʰ		tsʰ	tsʰ	ɕ	ȶ	ȶʰ	ȶʰ	ȶʰ	h
*ɟ		ts	ts	tɕ	ȶ	ȶ	ȶ	tɕ	s
*ʔɟ	*ɲc	dʑ	dʑ	j	ȡ	ȡ	dz	tɕ	dz
*ɟʰ	*ɲcʰ	dzj	dzj	ɕ	s	ɕ	s	tɕʰ	dzj
*ɲɟ		dz	dz	dʑ	ȡ	ȡ	ȡ	tɕ	dz
*ʔɲ		ȵ	ȵ	ȵ	ȵ	ȵ	ȵ	ȵ	ȵ
*hɲ		ȵ̥	ȵ̥	ȵ	ȵ	ȵ	ȵ̥	ȵ	ȵ
*ɲ		ȵ	ȵ	ȵ	ȵ	ȵ	ȵ	ȵ	ȵ
*ʔj		j	j	j	j	j	j	j	j
*j		j	j	j	j	j	j	j	dz
*cw		tsw	tsw	tɕw	s	ɕ	ȶ	tɕ	ts
*cʰw		tsʰ	tsʰ	ɕw	s	ɕ	ȶʰw	tɕʰ	ts
*ɟw		tsw	tsw	tɕw	ȶ	ȶ	ȶw	tɕw	ts
*ɲw		ȵ	ȵw	ȵw	ȵ	ȵ	ȵ	ȵ	ȵ
*k		k	k	k	k	k	k	k	k
*kʰ		kʰ	k/kʰ	kʰ	k	kʰ	k	kʰ	k/f
*ʔg	*ŋk	g	g	d	d	d	k	k	k
*ʔŋ		ŋ	ŋ	ŋ	ŋ	ŋ	ŋ	ŋ	ŋ
*ŋ		ŋ	ŋ	ŋ	ŋ	ŋ	ŋ	ŋ	ŋ
*x		dʑ	j	j	ȡ	ȡ	ȡ	k	k
*ɣ		dʑ	j	j	ȡ	ȡ	ȡ	k	g
*kw		kw	kw	kw	kw	kw	kw	kw	k
*kʰw		kʰ	kʰw	kʰ	k	kʰ	kʰw	kʰw	h
*gw		kw	kw	kw	kw	kw	kw	kw	f
*ʔgw	*ŋkw	g	g	g	g	g	gw	k/kw	g
*gʰw	*ŋkʰw	g	g	g	g	g	gw	g	g
*ŋgw		g	g	g	g	g	gw	kw	g
*kj		tɕ	tɕ	tɕ	s	ɕ	ȶ	tɕ	k
*kwj		tɕ	tɕw	tɕw	s	ɕ	ȶw	tɕw	ts
*gj		tɕ	tɕ	tɕ	ȶ	ȶ	ȶ	tɕ	k
*gwj		kwj	kj	kj	kw	kw	ȶ	tɕ	kj
*ʔgj		g	g	g	gj	gj	g	k/kj	g
*kl		tɕ	k	kj	kj	kj	kl	kl	ts
*kl		tɕ	k	k	kj	kj	kl	kl	k
*kl		tɕ	k	kj	kj	kj	kl	kl	t
*kwl		tɕw	kw	kw	kw	kw	kl	kl	k
*klj		tɕ	kj	kj	kj	kj	kl	klj	kj
*gl		tɕ	k	kl	tl	kl	kl	kl	k
*glj		tɕ	k	kl	tl	kl	kl	klj	kj
*ŋgl		dʑ	g	gl	dl	gl	gl	kl	g
*ʔ		ʔ	ʔ	ʔ	ʔ	ʔ	ʔ	ʔ	ʔ
*h		h	h	h	h	h	h	h	v
*ɦ		ɦ	Ø	ɦ	ɦ	ɦ	ɦ	ɦ	ɦ

=== Rimes ===
Reflexes of Proto-Mienic rimes in synchronic Mienic languages (Liu 2021):

Proto-Mienic	Jiangdi Mien	Miaoziyuan Mien	Luoxiang Mien	Liangzi Mun	Tansan Mun	Dongshan Biao Min	Shikou Biao Min	Daping Dzao Min
*i	e	e	i	i	i	i	i/e	i/ɛi
*im	im	iŋ	im	im	im	ɛn	en	um
*iːm	iːm	iŋ	im	im	im	in	iŋ	ɛm
*in	in	iŋ	in	in	in	ɛn	en	ɛn
*iːn	iːn	iŋ	in	in	iːn	ən	eŋ	ɛn
*iŋ	aŋ	aŋ	aŋ	iŋ	iŋ	aŋ	aŋ	aŋ
*iːŋ	iːŋ	iŋ	iŋ	iŋ	iːŋ	ɛ	aŋ	aŋ
*iːp	ip	i	ip	ip	iːp	in	ɛ	ɛp
*it	it	i		it			i	
*ik	i	ei	i	i	i	i	iŋ	ɛ
*e	i	ei	i	i	i	i	i	ɛ
*ei	ei	ei	ei	ei	ɛi	əi	i	ɛi
*ei	ei	ei	ei	ei	ɛi	əi	i	i
*ei	ei	ei	ei	ei	ɛi	i	e	i
*em	om	əŋ	em	am	am	an	en	um
*eːm	iːm	əŋ	em	eːm	iːm	ən	eŋ	um
*en	en	əŋ	en	in	in	in	en	ɛn
*eːn	eːn	əŋ	en	eːn	iːn	ən	eŋ	ɛn
*eːt	et	ei	et	eːt	iːt	ən	e	ɛt
*ɛːŋ	ɛːŋ	ɛŋ	ɛŋ	ɛŋ	ɛːŋ	ɛ	iŋ	ɛŋ
*ɛk	ɛ	ɛ	ɛ	ɛ	ɛ	ɛ	a	a
*æ	e	e	a	a	a	a	a	a
*æm	om	əŋ	em	im	im	an	an	ɛm
*æn	en	əŋ	an	an	an	an	ən	ɛn
*æːn	en	əŋ	an	aːn	aːn	an	ən	ɛn
*æŋ	eŋ	əŋ	aŋ	aŋ	aŋ	aŋ	aŋ	ɛŋ
*æp	op	e	ep	ap	ap	an	æ	ɛp
*æt	at	ə	ət	et	et	an	ɛ	ɔt
*æːt	at	ə	ət	ɛt	ɛːt	ə	ɛ	ɔt
*æk	e	e	a	a	a	a	a	a
*a	a	a	a	a	a	a	a	a
*ai	ai	ai	ai	ai	ai	ai	ai	ɛi
*aːi	aːi	a	aːi	aːi	aːi	a	ai	ai
*aːi	ai	ai	ai	ai	aːi	ai	ai	ai
*aːi	aːi	a	aːi	aːi	aːi	a	ai	ai
*aːi (Note: Loose sound correspondences; not exact)	aːi	a	aːi	aːi	aːi	a	ai	ai
*aːi (Note: Loose sound correspondences; not exact)	ai	ai	ai	ai	aːi	ai	ai	ai
*au	au	au	au	au	au	a	ɔu	iu
*aːu	aːu	a	aːu	au	aːu	a	au	au
*am	am	aŋ	am	am	am	an	an	am
*aːm	aːm	aŋ	aːm	aːm	aːm	an	ɔn	ɔm
*an	an	əŋ	ən	an	an	an	ən	an
*aːn	aːn	aŋ	aːn	an	aːn	an	ən	ɔn
*aːn	aːn	aŋ	an	an	aːn	an	ən	an
*aŋ	aŋ	aŋ	aŋ	aŋ	aŋ	aŋ	aŋ	aŋ
*aːŋ	aːŋ	aŋ	aːŋ	aŋ	aːŋ	aŋ	aŋ	aŋ
*ap	ap	a	ap	ap	ap	an	æ	ap
*aːp	aːp	a	aːp	aːp	aːp	an	æ	ap
*at	at	a	at	at	at	an	æ	at
*aːt	aːt	a	aːt	aːt	aːt	an	æ	at
*ak	a	a	a	a	a	a	a	a
*aːk	o	ɔ	ɔːk	aːk	ak	ɔ	ɔ	ɔu
*o	u	u	o	u	u	u	u	ɔu
*ou	u	u	ou	ou	ɔu	ɔ	eu	au
*oŋ	oŋ	oŋ	oŋ	ɔŋ	ɔŋ	ɔŋ	ɔŋ	ɔŋ/uŋ
*oːŋ	oŋ	oŋ	oŋ	ɔŋ	ɔːŋ	ɔŋ	ɔŋ	uŋ
*op (Note: Attested in only one word, 'skin (皮)')	op	əu	up	op	up	in	ɛ	ip
*oːp (Note: Attested in only one word, 'pigeon (鸽子)')	op	oːp	op	ɔk	ɔp			u
*ot	ot	ə	ot	ɔt	ɔt	an	ɛ	
*ok	u	u	o	ɔ	ɔ	ɔ	ɔ	ɔu
*ɔ	o	ɔ	ɔ	ɔ	ɔ	ɔ	ɔ	ɔu
*ɔːi	oːi	a	ɔi	ɔi	ɔːi	ai	ei	æ
*ou	o	ə	u	u	u	au	ɔu	u
*iɔu	ou	əu	eu	ou	ɔu	au	ɔu	iu
*iɔu	ou	əu	eu	ou	ɔu	au	ɔu	u
*iɔu	ou	əu	ou	ou	ɔu	əu	eu	u
*iɔu	ou	əu	ou	ou	ɔu	əu	iu	u
*iɔu	ou	əu	eu	ou	ɔu	au	ɔu	ɛu
*ɔm	om	oŋ	om	ɔm	ɔm	an	ɔn	ɔn
*ɔːm	oːm	ɔŋ	ɔm	ɔm	ɔːm	ɔ	ɔ	ɔm
*ɔːn	oːn	aŋ	ɔːŋ	ɔn	ɔːn	an	ən	an
*ɔŋ	aŋ	əŋ	əŋ	ɔŋ	ɔŋ	ɔŋ	ɔŋ	uŋ
*ɔːŋ	oːŋ	ɔŋ	ɔŋ	ɔŋ	ɔːŋ	ɔ	oŋ	ɔŋ
*ɔt	at	a	ɔt	ɔi	ɔːi	a	ɛ	ɛt
*ɔk	o	ɔ	ɔ	ɔ	ɔ	ɔ	ɔ	ɔu
*ɔːk	u	u	ok	ɔːk	ɔːk	u	u	u
*u	o	ə	u	u	u	u	u	u
*uːi	uːi	ui	ui	ui	uːi	əi	ei	ai
*uːi	uːi	ui	ui	ui	uːi	əi	i	i
*iu	iu	iu	iu	iu	iu	iu	iu	iu
*iːu	iu	iu	eu	eu	iːu	au	iu	ɛu
*um	om	oŋ	um	um	um	in	œn	um
*un	un	uŋ	un	un	un	un	un	in
*uŋ	uŋ	uŋ	uŋ	uŋ	uŋ	ə	ɔŋ	ɔŋ
*uŋ	uŋ	uŋ	uŋ	uŋ	uŋ	ə	ɔŋ	iŋ
*uŋ	aŋ	əŋ	oŋ	uŋ	uŋ	ɔŋ	aŋ	aŋ
*uːŋ	uŋ	uŋ	uŋ	uːŋ	uːŋ	ə	ɔŋ	iŋ
*ut	ut	u	ut	ut	ut	un	ɛ	ut
*uːt	ut	u	ut	uːt	uːt	in	ɛ	ut
*uk	u	əu	u	u	u	u	ɔ	iu

=== Tones ===
Proto-Mienic tonal categories and their respective tone pitch reflexes in synchronic Mienic languages (Liu 2021):

Proto-Mienic	Jiangdi Mien	Miaoziyuan Mien	Luoxiang Mien	Liangzi Mun	Tansan Mun	Dongshan Biao Min	Shikou Biao Min	Daping Dzao Min
*1	33	33	33	35	35	33	33	44
*1	33	33	33	31	13	33	33	44
*2	31	31	31	33	33	31	55	53
*3	52	53	53	545	55	35	35	24
*3	52	53	53	43	42	35	35	24
*4	231	232	213	32	31	42	31	44
*5	24	35	35	44	335	24	44	42
*5	24	35	55	21	331	24	44	42
*6	13	11	11	22	32	42	13	22
*7	55	54	43	24	35	53	35	44
*7	55	54	43	54	35	53	35	44
*7	55	54	43	31	12	53	35	44
*7	55	54	43	32	12	53	35	44
*8	12	21	32	42	32	42	22	22
*8	12	21	32	21	32	42	22	22

== Sound changes ==
Sound change innovations in synchronic Mienic languages (Liu 2021:156–157, 228):

Initials
Proto-Mienic	Reflex	Dialect
*p	b	Shikou, Daping
*pʰ	p	Liangzi, Daping
*ʔm	m	all Mienic lects
*hm	m	Liangzi, Tansan, Shikou, Daping
*pw	b	Shikou, Daping
*t	d	Shikou, Daping
*tʰ	t	Liangzi
*tʰ	h	Daping
*ʔn	n	all Mienic lects
*hn	n	Liangzi, Tansan, Shikou, Daping
*hl	l	Liangzi, Tansan, Shikou, Daping
*ʔg	d	Luoxiang, Liangzi, Tansan
*s	f	Jiangdi, Miaoziyuan
*s	h	Daping
*sʰ	h	Daping
*tw	d	Shikou, Daping
*ts	θ	Luoxiang, Tansan
*ts	t	Daping
*dz	h	Daping
*ʔɲ	ɲ	all Mienic lects
*j	dz	Daping
*ɦ	zero	Miaoziyuan
*pj	bj > b	Shikou, Daping
*bj	f	Liangzi, Tansan
*ʔl	l	all Mienic lects
*ʔr/*hr/*r	l	Jiangdi, Miaoziyuan, Dongshan, Shikou
*ʔr/*hr/*r	g	Luoxiang, Liangzi, Tansan
*ʔr/*hr/*r	dz	Daping
*hɲ	ɲ	Liangzi, Tansan, Shikou, Daping
*ʔŋ	ŋ	all Mienic lects

Rimes
Proto-Mienic	Reflex	Dialect
*i	e	Jiangdi, Miaoziyuan
*m	n	Miaoziyuan, Dongshan, Shikou
*p/*t	n	Dongshan
*ai	ɛi	Daping
*æːŋ	iŋ	Shikou
*æ	e	Jiangdi, Miaoziyuan
*ɛ	a	Shikou, Daping
*u	ə	Miaoziyuan
*u	o	Jiangdi
*ɔu	ə	Miaoziyuan
*ɔu	o	Jiangdi
*ɔŋ	aŋ	Jiangdi
*ɔŋ	əŋ	Miaoziyuan, Luoxiang
*uŋ	ə	Dongshan
*aːŋ	ɔŋ	Shikou, Daping
*æ	e	Jiangdi, Miaoziyuan
*aːn	ən	Shikou
*aːp	an	Dongshan
*aːu	a	Miaoziyuan, Dongshan
*aŋ	ɛ	Daping
*at	an	Dongshan

== See also ==
- Proto-Hmong–Mien language
- Proto-Hmongic language
- Mienic languages
- Proto-Hmong-Mien reconstructions (Wiktionary)
- Proto-Mienic reconstructions (Wiktionary)
- Mienic comparative vocabulary list (Wiktionary)
