= Proto-Uto-Aztecan language =

Reconstructed ancestor of the Uto-Aztecan languages

Proto-Uto-Aztecan
- PUA
- Reconstruction of: Uto-Aztecan languages
- Region: Aridoamerica
- Era: 3,000 BCE
- Lower-order reconstructions: Proto-Nahuan

Proto-Uto-Aztecan is the hypothetical common ancestor of the Uto-Aztecan languages. Authorities on the history of the language group have usually placed the Proto-Uto-Aztecan homeland in the border region between the United States and Mexico, namely the upland regions of Arizona and New Mexico and the adjacent areas of the Mexican states of Sonora and Chihuahua, roughly corresponding to the Sonoran Desert and the western part of the Chihuahuan Desert. It was spoken by Mesolithic foragers in Aridoamerica, about 5,000 years ago.

== Homeland ==
Reconstructions of the botanical vocabulary offer clues to the ecological niche inhabited by the Proto-Uto-Aztecans. Fowler placed the center of Proto-Uto-Aztecan in Central Arizona with northern dialects extending into Nevada and the Mojave desert and southern dialects extending south through the Tepiman corridor into Mexico. The homeland of the Numic languages has been placed in Southern California near Death Valley, and the homeland of the proposed Southern Uto-Aztecan group has been placed on the coast of Sonora.

A contrary proposal suggests the homeland of Proto-Uto-Aztecan to have been much farther to the south; it was published in 2001 by Jane H. Hill, based on her reconstruction of maize-related vocabulary in Proto-Uto-Aztecan. By her theory, the assumed speakers of Proto-Uto-Aztecan were maize cultivators in Mesoamerica, who gradually moved north, bringing maize cultivation with them, during the period of roughly 4,500 to 3,000 years ago. The geographic diffusion of speakers corresponded to the breakup of linguistic unity. The hypothesis has been criticized on several grounds, and it is not generally accepted by Uto-Aztecanists. Using computational phylogenetic methods, Wheeler & Whiteley (2014) also suggest a southern homeland for Proto-Uto-Aztecan in or near the area occupied by historical Cora and some Nahua. Nahuatl forms the most basal clade in Wheeler & Whiteley's (2014) Uto-Aztecan phylogram. A survey of agriculture-related vocabulary by Merrill (2012) found that the agricultural vocabulary can be reconstructed for only Southern Uto-Aztecan. That supports a conclusion that the Proto-Uto-Aztecan speech community did not practice agriculture but adopted it only after entering Mesoamerica from the north.

A more recent proposal from 2014, by David L. Shaul, presents evidence suggesting contact between Proto-Uto-Aztecan and languages of central California, such as Esselen and the Yokutsan languages. Based on the proposed contact zone, Shaul suggests that Proto-Uto-Aztecan was spoken in California's Central Valley area, and it formed part of an ancient Californian linguistic area.

== Phonology ==
=== Vowels ===
Langacker (1970)
	Front	Central	Back
Close	*i	*ɨ	*u
Mid			*o
Open		*a	

Proto-Uto-Aztecan is reconstructed as having an unusual vowel inventory: *i *a *u *o *ɨ. Langacker (1970) demonstrated that the fifth vowel should be reconstructed as *ɨ as opposed to *e, and there has been a long-running dispute over the proper reconstruction.

=== Consonants ===
	Bilabial	Coronal	Palatal	Velar		Glottal
	Bilabial	Coronal	Palatal	plain	labial	Glottal
Plosive	*p	*t		*k	*kʷ	*ʔ
Affricate		*ts				
Fricative		*s				*h
Nasal	*m	*n		*ŋ		
Liquid		*r	*j		*w	

*n and *ŋ may have actually been *l and *n.

== Sources ==
- Brown, Cecil H. (2010). "Lack of linguistic support for Proto-Uto-Aztecan at 8900 BP (letter)". Proc. Natl. Acad. Sci. USA. 107 (15): E34, author reply E35–6. doi:10.1073/pnas.0914859107. PMC 2841887. PMID 20231478.
- Caballero, G. (2011). "Behind the Mexican Mountains: Recent Developments and New Directions in Research on Uto-Aztecan Languages". Language and Linguistics Compass. 5 (7): 485–504. doi:10.1111/j.1749-818x.2011.00287.x.
- Campbell, Lyle (1997). American Indian Languages: The Historical Linguistics of Native America. Oxford University Press.
- Campbell, Lyle (2003). "What drives linguistic diversification and language spread?". In Bellwood, Peter; Renfrew, Colin (eds.). Examining the farming/language dispersal hypothesis. Cambridge(U.K.): McDonald Institute for Archaeological Research. pp. 49–63.
- Campbell, Lyle; Poser, William J. (2008). Language classification, history and method. Cambridge University Press.
- Cortina-Borja, M; Valiñas-Coalla, L (1989). "Some remarks on Uto-Aztecan Classification". International Journal of American Linguistics. 55 (2): 214–239. doi:10.1086/466114. S2CID 145309871.
- Cortina-Borja, M.; Stuart-Smith, J.; Valiñas-Coalla, L. (2002). "Multivariate classification methods for lexical and phonological dissimilarities and their application to the Uto-Aztecan family". Journal of Quantitative Linguistics. 9 (2): 97–124. doi:10.1076/jqul.9.2.97.8485. S2CID 205390627.
- Dakin, Karen (1996). "Long vowels and morpheme boundaries in Nahuatl and Uto-Aztecan: comments on historical developments" (PDF). Amerindia. 21. Archived from the original (PDF) on 2018-11-13.
- Fowler, Catherine S. (1983). "Some lexical clues to Uto-Aztecan prehistory". International Journal of American Linguistics. 49 (3): 224–257. doi:10.1086/465789. S2CID 143511895.
- Goddard, Ives (1996). "Introduction". In Goddard, Ives (ed.). Handbook of North American Indians. Vol. 17. Washington, D.C.: Smithsonian Institution. pp. 1–16.
- Haugen, J. D. (2008). Morphology at the interfaces: reduplication and noun incorporation in Uto-Aztecan. Vol. 117. John Benjamins Publishing.
- Heath, J. (1978). "Uto-Aztecan* na-class verbs". International Journal of American Linguistics. 44 (3): 211–222. doi:10.1086/465546. S2CID 16989534.
- Hill, Jane H. (December 2001). "Proto-Uto-Aztecan". American Anthropologist. New Series. 103 (4): 913–934. doi:10.1525/aa.2001.103.4.913. JSTOR 684121.
- Hill, Jane H. (2010). "New evidence for a Mesoamerican homeland for Proto-Uto-Aztecan". PNAS. 107 (11): E33, author reply E35–6. Bibcode:2010PNAS..107E..33H. doi:10.1073/pnas.0914473107. PMC 2841890. PMID 20231477.
- Hill, J. H. (2011). "Subgrouping in Uto-Aztecan. Language Dynamics and Change". Language Dynamics and Change. 1 (2): 241–278. doi:10.1163/221058212x643978.
- Iannucci, David (1972). Numic historical phonology. Cornell University PhD dissertation.
- Kaufman, Terrence (2001). Nawa linguistic prehistory. Mesoamerican Language Documentation Project. Archived from the original on 2016-03-03.
- Kaufman, Terrence (1981). Lyle Campbell (ed.). Comparative Uto-Aztecan Phonology. Unpublished manuscript.
- Kemp; González-Oliver; Malhi; Monroe; Schroeder; McDonough; Rhett; Resendéz; Peñalosa-Espinoza; Buentello-Malo; Gorodetsky; Smith (2010). "Evaluating the farming/language dispersal hypothesis with genetic variation exhibited by populations in the Southwest and Mesoamerica". Proc. Natl. Acad. Sci. USA. 107 (15): 6759–6764. Bibcode:2010PNAS..107.6759K. doi:10.1073/pnas.0905753107. PMC 2872417. PMID 20351276.
- Kroeber, Alfred Louis (1907). Shoshonean dialects of California. The University Press.
- Kroeber, Alfred Louis (1934). Uto-Aztecan Languages of Mexico. Vol. 8. University of California Press.
- Langacker, Ronald W. (1970). "The Vowels of Proto Uto-Aztecan". International Journal of American Linguistics. 36 (3): 169–180. doi:10.1086/465108. S2CID 144762214.
- Langacker, R. W. (1977). An overview of Uto-Aztecan grammar. Summer Institute of Linguistics.
- Langacker, R. W. (1976). Non-distinct arguments in Uto-Aztecan. Berkeley: University of California Press.
- Manaster Ramer, Alexis (1992). "A Northern Uto-Aztecan Sound Law: *-c- → -y-¹". International Journal of American Linguistics. 58 (3): 251–268. doi:10.1086/ijal.58.3.3519784. JSTOR 3519784. S2CID 148412173.
- Merrill, William L.; Hard, Robert J.; Mabry, Jonathan B.; Fritz; Adams; Roney; MacWilliams (2010). "Reply to Hill and Brown: Maize and Uto-Aztecan cultural history". Proc. Natl. Acad. Sci. USA. 107 (11): E35–E36. Bibcode:2010PNAS..107E..35M. doi:10.1073/pnas.1000923107. PMC 2841871.
- Merrill, W (2013). "The genetic unity of southern Uto-Aztecan". Language Dynamics and Change. 3: 68–104. doi:10.1163/22105832-13030102.
- Merrill, William L. (2012). "The Historical Linguistics of Uto-Aztecan Agriculture". Anthropological Linguistics. 54 (3): 203–260. doi:10.1353/anl.2012.0017. hdl:10088/21580. S2CID 144089923.
- Miller, Wick R. (1986). "Numic Languages". In Warren L. d’Azevedo (ed.). Handbook of North American Indians, Volume 11, Great Basin. Washington: Smithsonian Institution. pp. 98–106.
- Miller, Wick R. (1983). "A note on extinct languages of northwest Mexico of supposed Uto-Aztecan affiliation". International Journal of American Linguistics. 49 (3): 328–333. doi:10.1086/465793. S2CID 144510097.
- Miller, Wick R. (1983). "Uto-Aztecan languages". In Ortiz, Alfonso (ed.). Handbook of North American Indians. Vol. 10. Washington, D.C.: Smithsonian Institution. pp. 113–124.
- Miller, Wick R. (1984). "The classification of the Uto-Aztecan languages based on lexical evidence". International Journal of American Linguistics. 50 (1): 1–24. doi:10.1086/465813. S2CID 144398421.
- Mithun, Marianne (1999). The languages of Native America. Cambridge University Press.
- Sapir, E. (1913). "Southern Paiute and Nahuatl, a study in Uto-Aztekan". Journal de la Société des Américanistes. 10 (2): 379–425. doi:10.3406/jsa.1913.2866.
- Shaul, David L. (2014). A Prehistory of Western North America: The Impact of Uto-Aztecan Languages. University of New Mexico Press.
- Shaul, David L.; Hill, Jane H. (1998). "Tepimans, Yumans, and other Hohokam". American Antiquity. 63 (3): 375–396. doi:10.2307/2694626. JSTOR 2694626. S2CID 162215129.
- Steele, Susan (1979). "Uto-Aztecan: An assessment for historical and comparative linguistics". In Campbell, Lyle; Mithun, Marianne (eds.). The Languages of Native America: Historical and Comparative Assessment. Austin: University of Texas Press. pp. 444–544.
- Voegelin, C. F.; Voegelin, F.; Hale, K. (1962). Typological and Comparative Grammar of Uto-Aztecan: Phonology. Memoirs of the International Journal of American Linguistics. Vol. 17. Waverly Press.
- Wheeler, W. C.; Whiteley, P. M. (2014). "Historical linguistics as a sequence optimization problem: the evolution and biogeography of Uto-Aztecan languages" (PDF). Cladistics. 31 (2): 113–125. doi:10.1111/cla.12078. PMID 34758582. S2CID 86030904.
- Whorf, B. L. (1935). "The Comparative Linguistics of Uto-Aztecan". American Anthropologist. 37 (4): 600–608. doi:10.1525/aa.1935.37.4.02a00050.
