= Proto-Hmongic language =

Reconstructed ancestor of the Hmongic languages

Proto-Hmongic
- Proto-Miao
- Reconstruction of: Hmongic languages
- Reconstructed ancestor: Proto-Hmong–Mien

Proto-Hmongic or Proto-Miao (Chinese: 原始苗语) is the reconstructed ancestor of the Hmongic languages.

== Reconstructions ==
In China, the first comprehensive reconstruction of Proto-Hmongic (Proto-Miao) was undertaken by Wang Fushi (1979). Wang's 1979 manuscript was subsequently revised and published as Wang (1994).

Ratliff (2010) includes reconstructions of Proto-Hmong–Mien, Proto-Hmongic, and Proto-Mienic.

== Phonological development ==
=== Rimes ===
Below are some rime mergers in Proto-Hmongic, in which the first part of the Proto-Hmong-Mien rime is preserved.

| Proto-Hmong-Mien | Proto-Hmongic |
|---|---|
| *ɛj, *u̯̯ɛj | *u̯ɛ |
| *ei, *æi, *u̯ei, *u̯əi | *u̯ei |
| *əj, *aj, *u̯əj | *u̯a |
| *i, *i̯æn, *i̯əu, *i̯ɛk | *i |
| *ɨ, *i̯eu, *eu, *ik, *ek | *ɨ |
| *æu, *əu, *au, *ɔu | *æw |
| *uj, *up, *ut, *uk, *u̯ɛt, *u̯ɛk | *uw |
| *e, *ej, *ep, *et | *e |

On the other hand, Proto-Hmongic retains some Proto-Hmong-Mien rime distinctions, whereas Proto-Mienic has merged the rimes.

| Proto-Hmongic | Proto-Hmong-Mien | Proto-Mienic |
|---|---|---|
| *u̯ɛ | *ɛj | *ai |
| *u̯a | *aj | *ai |
| *i | *i̯æn | *æn |
| *æn | *æn | *æn |
| *æw | *əu | *əu |
| *o | *əw | *əu |
| *æw | *au | *au |
| *æ | *æw | *au |
| *æw | *uw | *u |
| *o | *u̯o | *u |
| *u | *u | *u |
| *uw | *ut | *ut |
| *ow | *əut | *ut |
| *uw | *uk | *ok |
| *ow | *ok | *ok |
| *in | *i̯əŋ | *i̯əŋ |
| *aŋ | *i̯aŋ | *i̯əŋ |
| *en | *eŋ | *eŋ |
| *ɔŋ | *u̯eŋ | *eŋ |
| *əŋ | *əŋ | *u̯əŋ |
| *ɔŋ | *u̯ɔŋ | *u̯əŋ |
| *əŋ | *əuŋ | *uŋ |
| *oŋ | *uŋ | *uŋ |
| *əŋ | *əaŋ | *aŋ |
| *aŋ | *aŋ | *aŋ |
| *ɛŋ | *ɛŋ | *əŋ |
| *ɔŋ | *u̯əŋ | *əŋ |

=== Final stops ===
The Proto-Hmongic tonal category C is derived from Proto-Hmong–Mien final *-k, while tonal category D in Proto-Hmongic is derived from Proto-Hmong–Mien finals *-p and *-t. Below are some examples of Proto-Hmongic tone C corresponding to Proto-Mienic tone D and Proto-Hmong-Mien final *-k.

| Gloss | Proto-Hmong-Mien | Proto-Hmongic | Proto-Mienic |
|---|---|---|---|
| bird | *m-nɔk | *m-nɔŋ^{C} | *nɔk^{D} |
| guest (MC khæk 客) | *Khæk | *qhæ^{C} | *khæk^{D} |
| hundred (MC pæk 百) | *pæk | *pæ^{C} | *pæk^{D} |
| strength (OC *kə.rək 力) | *-rək | *-ro^{C} | *khlək^{D} |
| six (PTB *k-ruk) | *kruk | *kruw^{C} | *krok^{D} |

Although Proto-Hmongic does not have explicitly reconstructed final stops (i.e., *-p, *-t, *-k), Pa-Hng and Qo Xiong have vowel quality distinctions that correspond to whether the Proto-Hmong-Mien rime was open or closed. For example:

| Proto-Hmong-Mien | Pa-Hng (Baiyun) | Qo Xiong (Jiwei) |
|---|---|---|
| *at | e, i | ei, i |
| *a | a | ɑ |
| *əp, *ət, *u̯ət | a | |
| *o, *u̯o, *əw, *i̯ou | o | |

Qo Xiong has -u for words developed from Proto-Hmong-Mien forms with closed rimes, while Qo Xiong words developed from Proto-Hmong-Mien forms with open rimes have -ə.

| Proto-Hmong-Mien | Qo Xiong |
|---|---|
| tone 7 (< *-p, *-t, *-k) | u |
| tones 1; 3, 4 (< *-X); 5, 6 (< *-H) | ə |

=== Final nasals ===
Ratliff (2010) reconstructions only one final nasal for Proto-Hmongic. *-n/*-ŋ are in complementary distribution with each other, with *-n occurring after front vowels. Other than as *-ŋ, the Proto-Hmongic final nasal can alternatively be reconstructed as a single *-N.

Taguchi (2022) proposes that nasal codas in open rimes in Proto-Hmongic are historically derived from nasal initial consonants.

=== Proposed onset velarization ===
Ostapirat (2016) proposes velarized initials in Proto-Hmongic, which are not reconstructed by Ratliff (2010) and others. Qo Xiong retains distinct initial reflexes for forms developed from Proto-Hmongic *m.l- (Note: m.- is a sesquisyllable.) (> Qo Xiong n-) versus *m.lˠ- (> Qo Xiong mj-).

| Gloss | Proto-Hmongic | Qo Xiong (Jiwei) | Hmu (Yanghao) | Mashan Miao (Zongdi) |
|---|---|---|---|---|
| rice plant | *m.l- | nɯ | na | mplæ |
| glutinous | *m.l- | nu | nə | mplu |
| tongue | *m.lˠ- | mjɑ | ɲi | mple |
| smooth | *m.lˠ- | mjɛ | — | mplein |

=== Initial velar and uvular consonants ===
Taguchi (2023) also suggests that Ratliff's (2010) Proto-Hmongic *k- and *q- are in fact secondary developments from Proto-Hmong–Mien *kr- and *k-, respectively. Ostapirat (2016) also revises Ratliff's uvulars (*q-, etc.) as velars (*k-, etc.).

== Irregular correspondences with Proto-Mienic ==
Some Proto-Hmongic and Proto-Mienic forms are cognate with each other, but a precise Proto-Hmong-Mien form cannot be easily reconstructed due to mismatches between the tonal categories, rimes, or onsets. Some examples of irregular correspondences between Proto-Hmongic and Proto-Mienic:

| Gloss | Proto-Hmong-Mien | Proto-Hmongic | Proto-Mienic |
|---|---|---|---|
| to eat | – | *nuŋ^{A} | *ɲən^{C} |
| finger | – | *nta^{B} | *ʔdok^{D} |
| crossbow | (*hnək) | *hnæn^{B} | *hnək^{D} |
| 3SG (he/she/it) | *ni̯æn(X) | *ni^{B} | *næn^{A} |
| to go | *n-mʉŋ(X) | *n-mʉŋ^{B} | *n-mɨŋ^{A} |

== See also ==
- Proto-Hmong–Mien language
- Proto-Mienic language
- Hmongic languages
- Proto-Hmong-Mien reconstructions (Wiktionary)
- Proto-Hmongic reconstructions (Wiktionary)
