= Proto-Turkic language =

Reconstructed ancestor of Turkic languages

Proto-Turkic
- Reconstruction of: Turkic languages
- Region: Probably the eastern part of Central Asia, possibly including regions of East Asia and Western Siberia
- Era: c. 3000 – c. 500 BCE
- Lower-order reconstructions: Proto-Common Turkic; Proto-Oghuric

Proto-Turkic is the linguistic reconstruction of the common ancestor of the Turkic languages that was spoken by the Proto-Turks before their divergence into the various Turkic peoples. Proto-Turkic separated into Oghur (western) and Common Turkic (eastern) branches. Candidates for the Proto-Turkic homeland range from western Central Asia to Manchuria, with most scholars agreeing that their migrations started from the eastern part of the Central Asian steppe, while one author has postulated that Proto-Turkic originated 2,500 years ago in East Asia.

The oldest records of a Turkic language, the Old Turkic Orkhon inscriptions of the 7th century Göktürk khaganate, already show characteristics of Eastern Common Turkic. For a long time, the reconstruction of Proto-Turkic relied on comparisons of Old Turkic with early sources of the Western Common Turkic branches, such as Oghuz and Kypchak, as well as the Western Oghur proper (Bulgar, Chuvash, Khazar). Because early attestation of these non-easternmost languages is much sparser, reconstruction of Proto-Turkic still rests fundamentally on the easternmost Old Turkic of the Göktürks, however it now also includes a more comprehensive analysis of all written and spoken forms of the language.

The Proto-Turkic language shows evidence of influence from several neighboring language groups, including Eastern Iranian, Tocharian, and Old Chinese.

== Origins ==
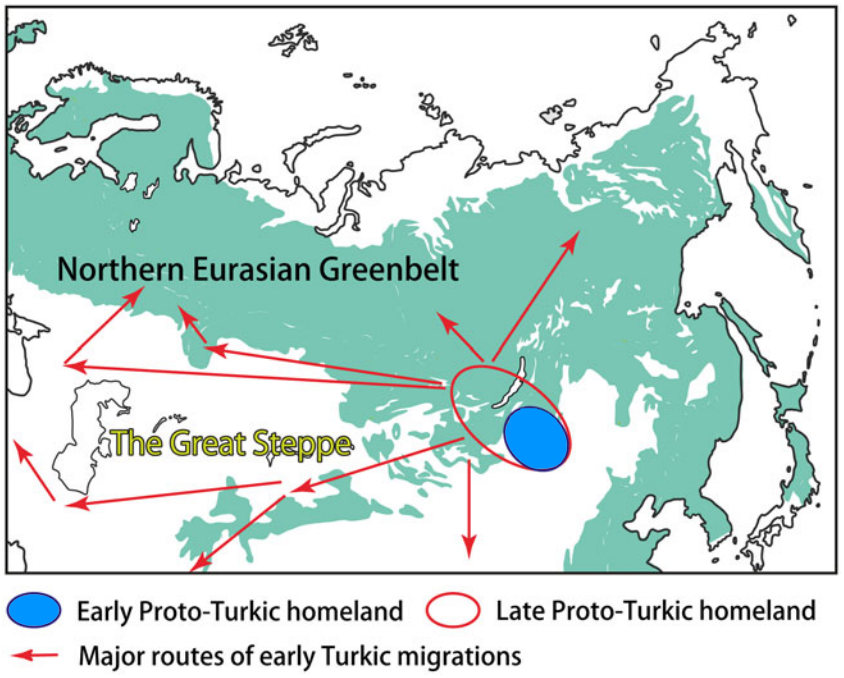
Proto-Turkic homeland and expansion.

There is general agreement among linguists and historians that Proto-Turkic was spoken somewhere in Central-East Asia. Its most likely ultimate homeland was modern-day Eastern Mongolia. From circa 1200 BCE, nomadic activity led to the expansion of Proto-Turkic into a wider area, from the Sayan-Altai Mountains in South Siberia, to Eastern Inner Mongolia. Proto-Turkic is thought to have split at the end of the first millennium BCE.

The likely ultimate homeland of Proto-Turkic in Eastern Mongolia was very close to the homeland of the Proto-Mongolic language in Southern Manchuria and the homeland of Proto-Tungusic in the area where modern-day China, Russia and North Korea meet, which would explain the proximity of these languages.

== Phonology ==
=== Consonants ===
The consonant system had a two-way contrast of stop consonants (fortis vs. lenis), k, p, t vs. g, b, d. There was also an affricate consonant, č; at least one sibilant s and sonorants m, n, ń, ŋ, r, l with a full series of nasal consonants. Some scholars additionally reconstruct the palatalized sounds ĺ and ŕ for the correspondence sets Oghuric /l/ ~ Common Turkic *š and Oghuric /r/ ~ Common Turkic *z. Most scholars, however, assume that these are the regular reflexes of Proto-Turkic *l and *r. Oghuric is thus sometimes referred to as Lir-Turkic and Common Turkic as Shaz-Turkic.

A glottochronological reconstruction based on analysis of isoglosses and Sinicisms points to the timing of the r/z split at around 56 BCE–48 CE. As Anna Dybo puts it, that may be associated with

the historical situation that can be seen in the history of the Huns' division onto the Northern and Southern [groups]: the first separation and withdrawal of the Northern Huns to the west has occurred, as was stated above, in 56 BC,... the second split of the (Eastern) Huns into the northern and southern groups happened in 48 AD.

Dybo suggests that during that period, the Northern branch steadily migrated from Western Mongolia through Southern Xinjiang into the north's Dzungaria and then finally into Kazakhstan's Zhetysu until the 5th century.

There was no fortis-lenis contrast in word-initial position: the initial stops were always *b, *t, *k, the affricate was always *č and the sibilant was always *s. In addition, the nasals and the liquids did not occur in that position either.

Type		Bilabial	Dental or alveolar	Palatal	Velar
Nasal		*m	*n	*ń /nʲ/	*ŋ
Plosive and affricate	fortis	*p	*t	*č /t͡ʃ/	*k
Plosive and affricate	lenis	*b	*d		*g
Sibilant			*s		
Liquid	lateral		*l	(*ĺ /lʲ/)	
Liquid	rhotic		*r	(*ŕ /rʲ/)	
Semivowel				*j	

Like in many modern Turkic languages, the velars /k/, /g/, and possibly /ŋ/ seem to have had back and front allophones ([k] and [q], [g] and [ɢ], [ŋ] and [ɴ]) according to their environments, with the velar allophones occurring in words with front vowels, and uvular allophones occurring in words with back vowels. The lenis stops /b/, /d/ and /g/~/ɢ/ may have tended towards fricatives intervocalically.

=== Vowels ===
Like most of its descendants, Proto-Turkic exhibited vowel harmony, distinguishing vowel qualities a, ï, o, u vs. e, ẹ, i, ö, ü, as well as two vowel quantities. Here, macrons represent long vowels. Some scholars (e.g. Gerhard Doerfer) additionally reconstruct a mid back unrounded *ë based on cognate sets with Chuvash, Tuvan and Yakut ï corresponding to a in all other Turkic languages, although these correspondences can also be explained as deriving from *a which underwent subsequent sound changes in those three languages. The phonemicity of the distinction between the two close unrounded vowels, i.e. front *i and back *ï, is also rejected by some.

Type	front		back	
Type	unrounded	rounded	unrounded	rounded
high	*i, *ī /i/	*ü, *ǖ /y/	*ï, *ï̄ /ɯ/	*u, *ū /u/
mid	*ẹ, *ẹ̄ /e/	*ö, *ȫ /ø/~/œ/	(*ë, *ë̄ /ɤ/)	*o, *ō /o/
low	*e, *ē /ɛ/	*ö, *ȫ /ø/~/œ/	*a, *ā /a/	

== Morphology ==
=== Nouns ===
==== Plurals ====
While plurality in modern Turkic languages is relatively straightforward, Proto-Turkic seemingly has multiple plural suffixes, with unclear use cases for each.

One plural suffix preserved in both Oghuric and Common Turkic is *-(I)ŕ, in words such as Turkish "ikiz" or "biz," or Chuvash "(e)pir."

Another possible plural suffix is *-(I)t, which was commonly seen in Old Turkic and preserved in very few words such as Turkish "oğlan." In the heavily discredited Altaic hypothesis, it is cognate with Proto-Mongolic *-d and Proto-Tungusic *-tA and *-(A)n.

Common Turkic languages today use their respective descendants of the Proto-Common-Turkic plural suffix *-lAr, whereas Chuvash uses -сем, which descends from Proto-Turkic *sāyïn ("every").

It is unknown whether the Proto-Common-Turkic *-lAr, *-(I)t, and *-(A)n existed in Proto-Turkic and were lost in the Oghuric branch, or were later inventions altogether.

==== Possessive suffixes ====
Reconstructable possessive suffixes in Proto-Turkic includes 1SG *-m, 2SG *-ŋ, and 3SG *-(s)i, plurals of the possessors are formed by *-z in Common Turkic languages.

=== Verbs ===
The reconstructable suffixes for the verbs include:

- Aorist: *-Vr
- Past: *-dI
- Negative suffix: *-mA
- 1SG: *-m (past tense) & *-mẹn (aorist and future tense) < *bẹn
- 2SG: *-ŋ (past tense) & *-sẹn (aorist and future tense) < *sẹn
- 3SG: *-∅ & *ol
- 1PL: *-m-iŕ (past tense, dual form of singular suffix) & *-biŕ (aorist and future tense) < *biŕ
- 2PL: *-ŋ-iŕ (past tense, dual form of singular suffix) & *-siŕ (aorist and future tense) < *siŕ

Proto-Turkic also involves derivation with grammatical voice suffixes, as in cooperative *körüĺ, middle *körün, passive *körül, and causative *körtkür.

== Vocabulary ==
=== Pronouns ===
	Proto-Turkic	Turkish	Azeri	Turkmen	Kazakh	Chuvash	Karakhanid	Uzbek	Uyghur	Bashkir	Kyrgyz	Sakha (Yakut)
I	*bẹ, *bẹn-	ben, ban-	mən	men	men, ma-	epĕ, man-	men, man-	men	men	min	men	min
you	*sẹ, *sẹn-	sen, san-	sən	sen	sen, sa-, siz	esĕ, san-	sen, san-	sen, siz	sen, siz	hin	sen, siz	en
he/she/it	*an-, *o-l	on-, o	on-, o	ol	on-, o-l	un-, văl	an-, ol	u	u	ul	al	kini, ol
we	*biŕ	biz	biz	biz	biz	epir, pir-	biz	biz	biz	beð	biz	bihigi
you (plural)	*siŕ	siz	siz	siz	sender, sizder	esir, sir-	siz	sizlar	senler, siler, sizler	heð	siler, sizder	ehigi
they	*o-lar	on-lar	onlar	olar	olar	vĕsem, vĕsen-	olar	ular	ular	ular	alar	kiniler, ollor

=== Numbers ===
	Proto-Turkic	Oghur Turkic		Common Turkic									
	Proto-Turkic	Volga Bulgar	Chuvash	Karakhanid	Turkish	Azeri	Turkmen	Kazakh	Uzbek	Uyghur	Bashkir	Kyrgyz	Sakha (Yakut)
1	*bīr	bīr	pĕr	bīr	bir	bir	bir	bir	bir	bir	ber	bir	biir
2	*ẹk(k)i	eki	ikĕ	ikkī	iki	iki	iki	eki	ikki	ikki	ike	eki	ikki
3	*üč	v^{e}č	viśĕ	üč	üç	üç	üç	üş	uch	üç	ös	üč	üs
4	*tȫrt	tüvet	tăvată	tȫrt	dört	dörd	dört	tört	toʻrt	tört	dürt	tört	tüört
5	*bẹ̄ĺ(k)	byel	pilĕk	bḗš	beş	beş	bäş	bes	besh	beş	biş	beş	bies
6	*altï	altï	ultă	altï̄	altı	altı	alty	altı	olti	alte	altı	altı	alta
7	*jẹt(t)i	čyeti	śičĕ	yétī	yedi	yeddi	ýedi	jeti	yetti	yetti	yete	jeti	sette
8	*sekiŕ	sekir	sakăr	sekiz	sekiz	səkkiz	sekiz	segiz	sakkiz	sekkiz	higeð	segiz	аğıs
9	*tokuŕ	tuxïr	tăhăr	tokūz	dokuz	doqquz	dokuz	toğız	toʻqqiz	toqquz	tuğıð	toguz	toğus
10	*ōn	van	vună	ōn	on	on	on	on	oʻn	on	un	on	uon
20	*jẹgirmi	čiyir^{i}m	śirĕm	yegirmī	yirmi	iyirmi	ýigrimi	jıyırma	yigirma	yigrime	yegerme	jıyırma	süürbe
30	*otuŕ	v^{u}t^{u}r	vătăr	ottuz	otuz	otuz	otuz	otız	oʻttiz	ottuz	utıð	otuz	otut
40	*kïrk	x^{ï}r^{ï}x	hĕrĕh	kïrk	kırk	qırx	kyrk	qırıq	qirq	qiriq	qırq	kırk	—
50	*ellig	ellü	ală	ellig	elli	əlli	elli	eliw	ellik	ellik	ille	elüü	—
60	*altmïĺ	—	utmăl	altmïš	altmış	altmış	altmyş	alpıs	oltmish	atmiş	altmış	altımış	—
70	*jẹtmïĺ	—	śitmĕl	yetmiš	yetmiş	yetmiş	ýetmiş	jetpis	yetmish	etmiş	yetmeş	jetimiş	—
80	*sekiŕ ōn	—	sakăr vun	seksȫn	seksen	səksən	segsen	seksen	sakson	seksen	hikhän	seksen	ağıs uon
90	*tokuŕ ōn	—	tăhăr vun	toksōn	doksan	doxsan	togsan	toqsan	toʻqson	toqsan	tuqhan	tokson	toğus uon
100	*jǖŕ	čǖr	śĕr	yǖz	yüz	yüz	ýüz	jüz	yuz	yüz	yöð	jüz	süüs
1000	*bïŋ	—	pin	miŋ	bin	min	müň	mıñ	ming	miñ	meñ	miñ	muñ

== Sources ==
- Antonov, Anton; Jacques, Guillaume (2012). "Turkic kümüš 'silver' and the lambdaism vs. sigmatism debate". Turkic Languages. 15 (2): 151–170.
- Décsy, Gyula (1998). The Turkic Protolanguage: A computational reconstruction.
- Vajda, Edward J. (2000). "Review of Décsy (1998)". Language. 76 (2): 473–474.
- Clauson, Gerard (1972). Etymological Dictionary of Pre-Thirteenth-Century Turkish. Oxford: Clarendon Press. ISBN 978-0-19-864112-4.
- Grønbech, Vilhelm (1997). Preliminary Studies in Turkic Historical Phonology (Uralic & Altaic). Curzon: Routledge. ISBN 0-7007-0935-5.
- Johanson, Lars (1998). "History of Turkic". In Johanson, Lars; Csató, Éva (eds.). The Turkic Languages. London: Taylor & Francis. pp. 81–125. ISBN 0-415-08200-5.
- Róna-Tas, András (1998). "The reconstruction of Proto-Turkic and the genetic question". In Johanson, Lars; Csató, Éva (eds.). The Turkic Languages. London: Taylor & Francis. pp. 67–80. ISBN 0-415-08200-5.
- Uchiyama, Junzo; Gillam, J. Christopher; Savelyev, Alexander; Ning, Chao (2020). "Populations dynamics in Northern Eurasian forests: a long-term perspective from Northeast Asia". Evolutionary Human Sciences. 2: 11. doi:10.1017/ehs.2020.11. ISSN 2513-843X. PMC 10427466.
