= Proto-Tungusic language =

Common ancestor of the Tungusic languages

Proto-Tungusic
- Reconstruction of: Tungusic languages
- Region: Lake Khanka (far eastern China–Russia border)
- Era: c. 500 BC – c. 500 AD
- Lower-order reconstructions: Proto-Ewenic; Proto-Udiheic; Proto-Nanaic; Proto-Jurchenic

Approximate Urheimat of Proto-Tungusic

Proto-Tungusic, (Note: /ˌproʊtoʊ tʊŋˈɡʊsɪk/ PROH-toh tuung-GUUS-ick) sometimes called Proto-Tungus–Manchu, is the reconstructed ancestor of the endangered Tungusic languages. Although its modern descendants are spoken over a wide area across the Russian Far East and northern China, linguists have narrowed the proto-language's origins to the area from around Lake Khanka southward toward the modern China–North Korea–Russia tripoint. Estimates of when the language was spoken vary somewhat, but it is believed to have been spoken around the turn of the first millennium AD. There is no consensus on precisely how the modern Tungusic languages are descended from Proto-Tungusic, but it eventually divided into four subfamilies: Ewenic, Udiheic, Nanaic, and Jurchenic.

The phonology of Proto-Tungusic is the subject of scholarly debate. Linguists are divided on how many vowels and diphthongs Proto-Tungusic had, as well as how to categorize the language's consonants. However, like other languages in the region, Proto-Tungusic exhibited vowel harmony, traditionally split into "male" and "female" categories. The exact mechanism by which these vowels were divided also remains the subject of debate, but the harmony system was governed either by vowel backness or by a retracted tongue root (RTR). Harmony was dictated by a word's first vowel and stress likely fell on the first syllable.

Grammatically, Proto-Tungusic was agglutinative and declined for number and case. It had at least two noun classes, which generally distinguished countable from uncountable nouns, and differentiated between alienable and inalienable possession. Proto-Tungusic had a constituent word order of subject–object–verb (SOV) and was head final. The language's vocabulary was heavily influenced by its neighboring languages, particularly Proto-Turkic and Proto-Mongolic. As Tungusic-speaking peoples spread from their homeland, they appear to have slowly and mostly peacefully linguistically assimilated speakers of other languages; the effect of those languages on Tungusic is unclear.

== History ==
Proto-Tungusic is the reconstructed ancestor of the Tungusic languages. These languages are spoken or attested largely in the Russian Far East and Manchuria, though a handful are found in Siberia and the Xinjiang region of Western China. Linguists have identified about twenty Tungusic languages, (Note: Given the relative salience of dialect continua among Tungusic speakers, distinguishing whether a spoken form is indicative of dialectal speech or of a distinct language is particularly difficult. Whaley & Oskolskaya (2020) suggest there are "twelve or so" Tungusic languages spoken today. Janhunen (2012) describes Tungusic less as a group of individual languages, but as "dialectal chains". It is also unclear if Oroch is still a living language.) which taken together comprise fewer than 100,000 modern speakers in total; all Tungusic languages are either endangered or extinct. Aside from the Jurchenic subfamily – which includes the Manchu, Xibe, and Jurchen languages – most Tungusic languages are poorly documented and none have any ancient manuscripts.

Reconstructions of Proto-Tungusic go at least as far back as 1949, with the work of Russian linguist V. I. Cincius entitled Сравнительная фонетика тунгусо-маньчжурских языков ('Comparative Phonetics of the Tunguso-Manchurian Languages'). This was later followed up with the comparative work Die tungusischen Sprachen: Versuch einer vergleichenden Grammatik ('The Tungusic Languages: An Attempt at a Comparative Grammar') by the German linguist Johannes Benzing in 1955. These two are considered the classic sources for reconstructions of Proto-Tungusic and remain highly regarded.

== Origins ==
=== Dating ===
Proto-Tungusic was probably spoken about two thousand years ago, sometime roughly between 500 BC and 500 AD. While there is some disagreement about the precise timing, all scientific estimates fall between 600 BC and 700 AD. Evidence for this time frame coincides with the region's Iron Age, as vocabulary for relatively complex metallurgical concepts are reconstructable to Proto-Tungusic. Compared to other proto-languages, this is relatively recent, especially given the wideness with which these languages are spread.

There is some evidence that the Tungusic languages appear to have begun fragmenting around the same time as the collapse of the Han dynasty in 220 AD. During this period, the Tungusic ethnonym Yilou changed to Wuji in the Chinese dynastic chronicles. A 2022 Bayesian inference suggests a breakup around 1 AD, which supports earlier analyses. Once Proto-Tungusic had begun its fragmentation, it is unclear how the daughter languages should be understood phylogenetically. Currently, there are four universally accepted subfamilies: Ewenic, Udiheic, Nanaic, and Jurchenic. There are currently four competing theories as to linguistic descent from Proto-Tungusic:

Ewenic-first

- Proto‑Tungusic
  - Ewenic
  - - Jurchenic
    - - Udiheic
      - Nanaic

North–South split

- Proto‑Tungusic
  - - Ewenic
    - Udiheic
  - - Nanaic
    - Jurchenic

Jurchenic-then-Nanaic

- Proto‑Tungusic
  - Jurchenic
  - - Nanaic
    - - Ewenic
      - Udiheic

Jurchenic-then-Ewenic

- Proto‑Tungusic
  - Jurchenic
  - - Ewenic
    - - Udiheic
      - Nanaic

The Finnish linguist Juha Janhunen considers the main division to be between Northern Tungusic (Ewenic and Udiheic) and Southern Tungusic (Nanaic and Jurchenic), though he concedes that this division may have been the result of earlier splits in the family. He considers the four-branch approach as potentially legitimate, if somewhat conservative. (Note: Janhunen also describes Udiheic and Nanaic as having potentially constituted a "central branch" in the north–south divide, but considers "the primary internal coherence of the central branch" as questionable.)

During the first millennium AD, the Liao River basin appears to have divided the Tungusic and Mongolic peoples, with Tungusic peoples occupying the eastern side of the basin and being predominately Jurchenic speaking. The Jin Empire (1115–1234) was a Jurchen-speaking state, and Tungusic languages were likely the languages of the Korean dynasties which ruled the Parhae and Goguryeo kingdoms as well. Later splits are much more recent. The split between Xibe and Manchu, for example, can be dated to 1764, when the Xibe people were forcibly removed from Manchuria to Xinjiang.

=== Urheimat ===
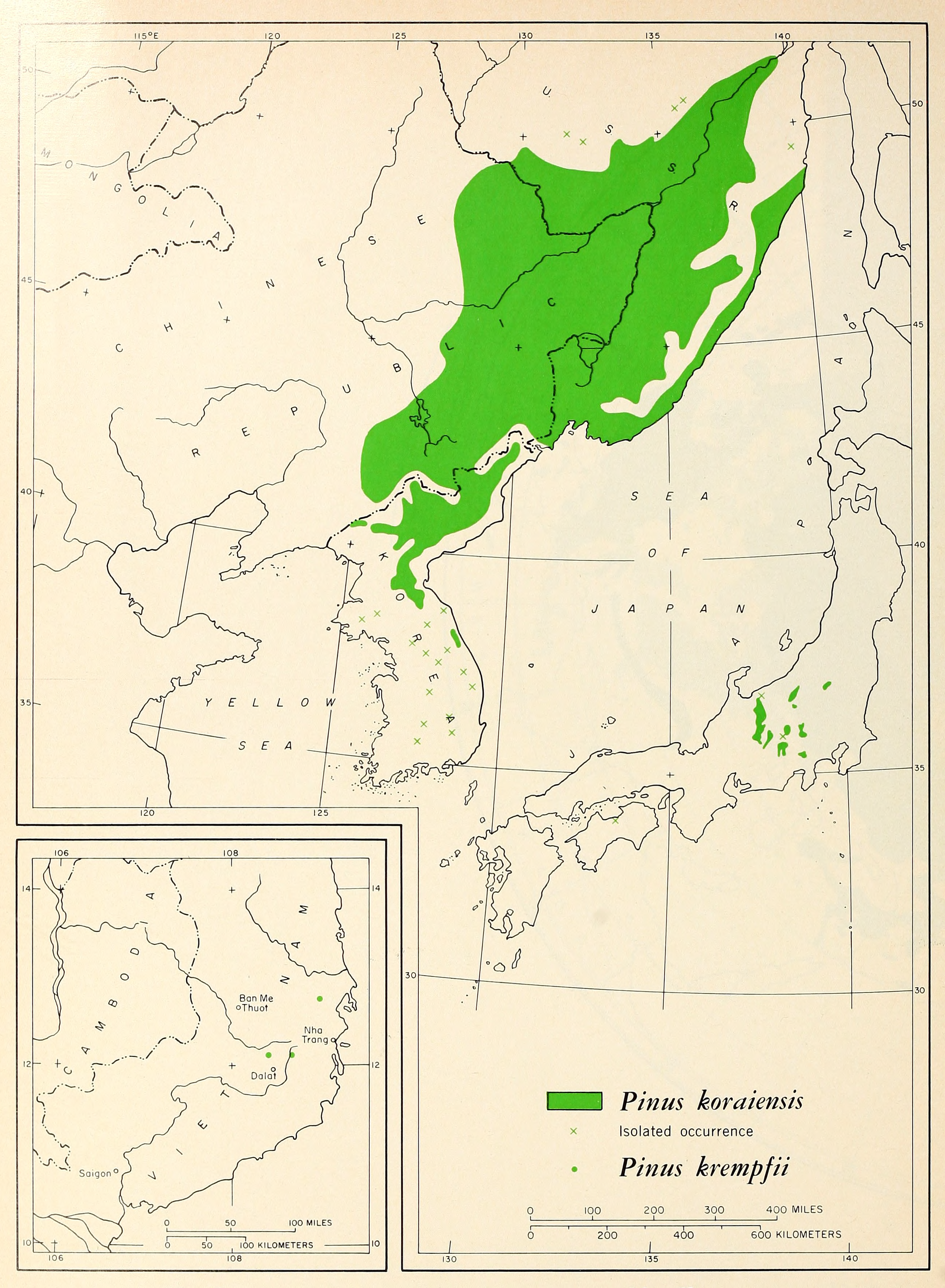
The relatively limited archeobotanical range of the Korean pine has helped identify the location of the Proto-Tungusic Urheimat.

The geographic origin of Proto-Tungusic has been the subject of scholarly debate. Early attempts to discern the location focused on lexical and archeological studies of remains, but more modern investigations have also included DNA analysis. Genetic evidence through the Tungusic-associated haplogroup C-M217 has helped determine location. Ancient genetic data from around the Devil's Gate maps closest to Tungusic groups when European admixture from Northwestern Tungusic groups, such as the Evens and Evenki, is accounted for. This places Tungusic origins as somewhere in Amur River region of the Russian Far East, though this timeframe suggests a period around 6000 BC, long before estimates of when Proto-Tungusic is estimated to have been spoken.

Given the clustering of Tungusic languages along the Sea of Japan, most proposals have been located at various points along its Russian coastline or interior, though a handful of older proposals have suggested origins around Lake Baikal. The Lake Baikal hypothesis, however, has been rejected, as the linguistic evidence demonstrates that certain reconstructable terms for flora are not attested in the Baikal region. Words for trees like Manchurian ash (*xibagda), Mongolian poplar (*xamigda), Amur linden (*kilden), and candle-shape maple (*molon) are all reconstructable to Proto-Tungusic, but none of these varieties are found in the area around Lake Baikal.

More recently, linguists such as Martine Robbeets have identified the area from around Lake Khanka down toward the modern-day China–North Korea–Russia tripoint as a better candidate for the origins of Proto-Tungusic. One piece of evidence toward this conclusion is that Proto-Tungusic distinguished between pine generally (*jagda), and two specific species: creeping pine (*bolgikta) and Korean pine (*koldon), the latter of which only grows in a limited area. Archeobotanical evidence shows that dwelling pits in the southern Primorye area from as early as 1300 BC contain the shells of Korean pine nuts. This has been cited as strong contributing evidence in placing Proto-Tungusic's origins around Lake Khanka.

=== Language contact and vocabulary ===
Over the course of relatively little time, the Tungusic languages spread throughout a wide area of Northeast Asia. They have been in near-constant contact with over a dozen other language families, both during and probably before the Proto-Tungusic period. Historically, influence from the Mongolic and Amuric languages strongly affected Tungusic, though the modern descendants more influenced by the ubiquity of Chinese and Russian in their respective countries. Old Chinese, however, did have contact with Proto-Tungusic; the Proto-Tungusic term *murgi ('barley and similar crops') is a loanword from Old Chinese 來 (mərˤək; 'a kind of wheat'), which maps with the archeological evidence of barley's introduction to the Iron Age Krounovskaya culture south of Lake Khanka.

Much of the Proto-Tungusic vocabulary was borrowed, especially from the neighboring Turkic and Mongolic languages. The Mongolic languages in particular had a long and deep effect on the Tungusic vocabulary. Often, Turkic terms were borrowed through a Mongolic intermediary and vice versa. For example, the Proto-Turkic term *kony ('sheep') passed to Proto-Mongolic as *konin or *kunin and then into Proto-Tungusic as *konin or *kunin. How these words entered Proto-Tungusic suggests that the language was spoken during the same period as the other two proto-languages. Much of the Mongolic vocabulary was spread by the Manchu, though among the northern Tungusic languages, the dispersal of both Turkic and Mongolic loans occurred through their interactions with the Yakut and their language. Later on, Turkic and Mongolic borrowings were then re-borrowed from one Tungusic language to another through their own interactions with each other.

Proto-Tungusic also shares some vocabulary with the nearby Nivkh language, as in Proto-Tungusic *ulgian and Nivkh олғоӈ (olghong), both meaning 'pig'. It is not clear, however, which language borrowed from which. The northward push of some Northern Tungus–speaking peoples into the Russian Far East probably displaced Nivkh- and other Amuric-speaking peoples. The spread of Ewenic-speaking peoples seems to correspond with the spread of the Mongol Empire along its northern border, possibly spurred on by a Dagur invasion of the original Ewenic homeland in Manchuria during the 10th and 11th centuries. Northern Tungus-speaking peoples also had contact with speakers of the Chukotko-Kamchatkan languages, from whom they borrowed substantial vocabulary early in their development. Similarly, the Southern Tungusic languages were affected typologically by their interactions with contemporary Chinese speakers and other languages in the area.

The Tungusic peoples appear to mostly have assimilated other peoples linguistically as they spread outward without significant violence or drastic replacement. Evidence of pre-Tungusic languages is retained in some toponyms, but it is not clear what languages these people spoke. It is possible they spoke Samoyedic or related Uralic languages, or perhaps some unrecorded Paleo-Siberian language. The effect of these languages on the Tungusic languages is more difficult to determine. The Northern Tungusic languages have many early borrowings unique to their group, while the Southern group has nearly none.

The Tungusic languages have also been in relatively constant contact with each other. This has led linguists to draw a distinction between common elements from language contact with other Tungusic languages, termed "Common Tungusic features", and common elements derived from their common Proto-Tungusic ancestor. According to the Russian linguist Alexander Pevnov, part of the problem with classifying the descendant subfamilies is that the linguistic changes are "not only of divergence, but also of convergence". Proto-Tungusic affected its neighbors as well. The Proto-Mongolic term *örüke ('smoke-hole') was probably borrowed from Proto-Tungusic *örke ('smoke-hole, door'), and Proto-Mongolic *xurakan ('snare') also appears to be a borrowing from Proto-Tungusic *purka.

== Phonology ==
=== Vowels ===
Proto-Tungusic had an eight-vowel system, with both long and short pairs. This system was as follows, with long vowels represented with duplicated vowels:

| | Front | | Central | Back |
| | unrounded | rounded | Central | Back |
|---|---|---|---|---|
| Close | *i *ii | *ü *üü | *ï *ïï | *u *uu |
| Mid | *e *ee (Note: Sometimes rendered as *ä and *ää.) | *ö *öö | | *o *oo |
| Open | *e *ee | | *a *aa | |

Some linguists, such as Sergei Starostin and John Whitman, have suggested a seven-vowel system. Whitman, for example, removes *ï from the proto-language's inventory on the basis that it is a marginal phoneme areally, that it does not seem to comport with certain elements of the language's vowel harmony system, and that explanations for its existence often rely on its being merged with *i in descendant languages. Starostin and other later formulated a smaller six-vowel system, though this has been rejected by linguists, especially since Starostin explicitly argued that vowel harmony should not be reconstructed for, beliving it to be contamination from the Mongolic languages. The eight-vowel system, however, has wide consensus among linguists. (Note: Whitman later returned to the eight-vowel system in his work. See Joseph, Ko & Whitman (2020) for examples.)

Whether the language's long vowels should be viewed as long vowels or as instances of two of the same vowel following each other is difficult to determine. Data from the descendant languages is mixed and contradictory, as a word in one language will appear to derive from an etymon with a long vowel, but a cognate in another will seem to derive from one with a short vowel. For example, the term *ŋaala ('hand') has been reconstructed with a long vowel based on evidence from languages like Even, Oroch, and Uilta, which all use ӈа̄ла (ŋaala), but the terms in Udege (ӈала, ŋala) and Manchu (ᡤᠠᠯᠠ, gala) suggest a short vowel; in Negidal, both the long form ӈа̄ла (ŋaala) and the short form ӈала (ŋala) are attested. The origins of the long vowels are also obscure; Juha Janhunen suggests they may have arisen following the elision of an intervocalic consonant such as *x and considers them bisegmental instances of the same vowel. Outcomes of length distinctions are less stable in non-initial syllables, except in suffixes, where they are especially well preserved in the Ewenic languages.

There are two securely reconstructed Proto-Tungusic diphthongs: (Note: Janhunen (2023) describes these sequences as "diphthongoids", but does not elaborate on the distinction. Ryzhkov-Shukumine (2020) and Oskolskaya (2024) both use diphthong.) *ie and *ïa. The diphthongoid *ie has only been reliably demonstrated in the reconstruction *niekii ('duck'), whence Manchu ᠨᡳᠶᡝᡥᡝ (niyehe) and Solon niixii; this diphthongoid becomes either [ʲeː] or [iː] in most daughter languages. The other diphthongoid is much more widespread and is usually rendered as either [ʲæː] or [ʲeː] in descendants. Examples include Proto-Tungusic *mïaban ('heart'), which gave rise to Manchu ᠨᡳᠶᠠᠮᠠᠨ (niyaman, from an older form *miyaman) and Even мявун (mɪawan, [mʲæːwən]).

It is likely that the diphthongs had a glide between them as *iye and *ïya, especially since there appears to have been some evidence of metathesis in later descendant languages, explaining Proto-Nanaic *xaï- ('what?') as a metathesized form of Proto-Tungusic *xïa-. It is also possible similar outcomes occurred when *u abutted another vowel, using *w as a glide. It is also possible that *w served as a glide for *ïa due to a strange set of correspondences for the word *nïa ('downstream'); Ewenic and Udiheic show the expected form, but Manchu demonstrates a *w-initial form and Nanaic, suggesting that the glide may have metathesized with the first vowel in some instances, from *nïwa to *nwïa.

Whether the language also had other diphthongs remains an open question. The diphthong *ua appears to be supported for terms like *juan ('ten') and *puan ('some'). Analyses using this diphthong may also help to resolve apparent isoglosses. For example, *ŋ in Northern Tungusic often corresponds to *w in Southern Tungusic; the correspondence between Northern forms like Even ӈа̄ӈтэ (ŋaaŋtə) and Southern forms like Ulch ваӈта (waŋta), both meaning 'fir', may be resolved with the Proto-Tungusic reconstruction *ŋuanta. The status of *au is less clear, only attributed to two terms: *au- ('to sleep') and its derivative *aunja- ('to spend a night'). Cincius, however, originally attributed both of these diphthongs to the long vowel *aa instead. A handful of irregularities in some correspondences has also led to *üi being reconstructed. Examples include *müiki ('snake'), whence Jurchen 𘹴𘾤 (müihä), and *müire ('shoulder'), whence Udege мюё (müö).

The sequences *üe, *öe, and *üi may have also used a glide, but evidence is unclear and outcomes are usually interpretable as a long vowel, *öö for the first two and *üü for the last. Some evidence in the daughter languages persist in having diphthongs however, especially in Nanaic and Jurchenic. For example, the reconstructed Proto-Tungusic form *jöör ('two') became Proto-Ewenic and Proto-Udiheic *juur, but became *juer in Proto-Nanaic and Proto-Jurchenic. For these reasons, the form has also been reconstructed as *jüer.

==== Vowel harmony ====
It is widely accepted that Proto-Tungusic exhibited vowel harmony. This harmony distinguished between two categories, traditionally rendered as "male" (Chinese: 陽, yang), and "female" (陰, yin): (Note: Sometimes termed "hard" and "soft", respectively, instead.)

| male | *u | *uu | *o | *oo | *a | *aa | *ï | *ïï | *ïa |
| female | *ü | *üü | *ö | *öö | *e | *ee | *i | *ii | *ie |

Each pair of monophthongs corresponds to an archiphoneme, represented with a capital letter; for example, *A stands for the alternating pairs *a–*e and *aa–*ee, though long forms are sometimes duplicated in writing, as in *II for *ii–*ïï. Harmony was progressive, determined by the vowel quality in the initial syllable. Because of this progressive quality and due to certain methods of final-vowel deletion in the modern Tungusic languages, it is hypothesized that stress in Proto-Tungusic fell on the first syllable.

Scholars, however, are divided on how to classify the vowel harmony system. One school of thought proposes that the distinction was between whether the root of the tongue was retracted (+RTR) or not (−RTR), while another distinguishes the classes by vowel backness. Some of the original vowel qualities are disputed based on the school of thought. For example, Whitman reconstructs the vowel system as follows:

| | Front | Central | Back |
|---|---|---|---|
| Close | *i | | *u |
| Close-mid | | | *ʊ |
| Mid | | *ə | *o |
| Open | | *a | *ɔ |

In this view, *i and *ï merge into *i, *ə corresponds to *e in the eight-vowel system, *ʊ corresponds to *ü, *o corresponds to *ö, and *ɔ corresponds to *o. Whatever this main form of harmony, there also is a tendency towards rounding harmony as well. In Proto-Tungusic, an underlying *a that follows a short *o will round to *o as well, as in *oron ('domesticated reindeer') from an earlier form **oran.

In Ewenic and Udiheic, the *U archiphoneme merged with *I in non-initial syllables, but *O merged with *U in all descendant languages in the same context. No modern descendant makes a distinction between historical *ï and *i, having merged into i, or between historical *u and *ü or *ö, but the distinction remains prevalent in the harmonic distinction in descendant languages. For example, in Evenki terms дыл (dil, 'head') and ил (il, 'sinew') are both pronounced with the vowel [i]. However, their accusative forms – дылва (dilwa) and илве (ilwe), respectively – differ because they are derived from Proto-Tungusic word in different harmonic classes: дыл comes from the male form *dïlï, while ил comes from the female form *xüli.

=== Consonants ===
The Proto-Tungusic consonant inventory is notably similar to its descendant languages, with little variation between modern reflexes. The consonant system was as follows:

| | | Labial | Alveolar | Palatal | Velar |
|---|---|---|---|---|---|
| Nasal | | *m | *n | *ñ (Note: Sometimes rendered ⟨ń⟩ or ⟨ň⟩.) | *ŋ |
| Stop | weak | *b | *d | *j | *g |
| Stop | strong | *p | *t | *c | *k |
| Fricative | | | *s | | *x |
| Semivowel | | *w | | *y | |
| Lateral | | | *l | | |
| Trill | | | *r | | |

What distinguished "strong" and "weak" stops is unknown; it may have been voicing (e.g., p ~ b), aspiration (pʰ ~ p), or a combination thereof (pʰ ~ b). The palatal stop series was likely affricated and velar consonants probably had uvular or otherwise "post-velar" allophones. The fricative *x may also have been more generally a laryngeal fricative rather than a strictly velar one.

There were two initial consonants which are only preserved in their original form in Nanaic: *x and *p. All other subfamilies elided an initial *x, as in Uilta худе (xude, 'heavy') but Oroch угге (ugge), both from Proto-Tungusic *xörge. For *p, the Jurchenic languages shift it to *f, as in Manchu ᡶᡝᠰᡳᠨ (fesin, 'shaft'), while the Ewenic and Udiheic shifted it to *x, as in Oroch хесин (xesin). The Nanaic languages preserved the *p, though Bikin dialect of Nanai spoken in the Pozharsky District later developed f through language contact with Jurchenic. Both the shared shift from *p to *x in Ewenic and Udiheic and the relatively recent shift in Jurchenic from *p to *f have been cited as evidence for the North–South split theory of Tungusic linguistic descent.

Consonants in Proto-Tungusic were constrained to certain places in a word. The consonant *x only occurred in onset, whereas a word could never begin with *r. The semivowel *y only occurred between vowels. The distribution of the palatal nasal *ñ is less clear; it occurs regularly in word-initial position and as a cluster on either side of the velar nasal *ŋ, as in *ñeŋñe ('springtime') and *añŋa ('year'), but is otherwise obscure.

=== Syllables ===
An underived root in Proto-Tungusic had a maximal syllable structure of (C)V(V)(C), where C represents any consonant, V represents any vowel, and parentheses represent that the phoneme is not mandatory in that position. (Note: VV represents a either two vowels or a long vowel.) Consonant clusters were only allowed in disyllabic roots when they occurred between two vowels, with a maximal disyllabic structure of (C)V(V)(C)CV(V), though they were relatively common with over thirty consonant cluster combinations reconstructed for. Clusters always began with a labial stop, a velar stop, a nasal, or a liquid, but always ended with either a stop or *s.

Ewenic and Udiheic later assimilated weak stop–nasal clusters into nasal clusters (Note: As in Evenki камнун (kamnun, 'glue'), from Proto-Tungusic *kamdon) or a nasal singleton when the place of articulation for the two clustered consonants was the same; Jurchenic and Nanaic preserved all of these clusters. The one possible exception is *ŋ, which is believed to have "clusterized" into *ŋg in Jurchenic and Nanaic as a result of contamination from the Mongolic languages, which underwernt a similar process.

Though some consonant-final disyllabic roots have been reconstructed, as have some polysyllabic roots, these are thought to be derivatives rather than underived root forms. Similarly, the relative rarity of (C)VVC and (C)VC syllable types is believed to represent an already archaic form falling out of use during the Proto-Tungusic period. When these structures are reconstructed, they only end in *g, *p, *l, *r, and *n. Monosyllabic roots were relatively rare and usually ended with class markers, such as in *xolsa ('fish') which is composed of the root *xol- and class marking suffix *-sa. Suffixes took the maximal syllable structure C(C)(V).

== Morphology ==
Roots in Proto-Tungusic comprised verbal roots, nominal roots, and a small class formed through uninflectable lexemes called "invariables". In terms of their syllable structure, these classes were identical, though only nominals are thought to have been free morphemes; verbs required certain additional suffixes to be grammatical. The language was agglutinating, following a strict pattern after the root: derivational suffixes first, then declensions for number, followed by case, and then finally clitics. All nominals, meaning both nouns and adjectives, declined for number and case.

=== Class and number ===
Proto-Tungusic had at least two noun classes, marked with *-sA for uncountable nouns and *-tA for countable nouns. For example, *seekse ('blood', uncountable) contrasts with *xüükte ('tooth', countable). (Note: The Jurchenic languages have a different suffix for uncountable nouns *-ŋgi, whence Manchu ᠰᡝᠩᡤᡳ (senggi, 'blood').) Both are often preceded by a velar stop of obscure origins, though *-sA is sometimes preceded by other consonants, the meaning of which is also unknown. Examples include the *l in *ölse ('meat') and the *n in *xïmansa ('snow'). The velar marker later developed into a suffix for animal products such as meat or fur, as in Nanai мапакса (mapaksa, 'bear skin'), from мапа (mapa, 'bear'). A group of nominals ending in *-n, known as the "unstable nasal" or "unstable n" because the final *-n was usually elided when the word was suffixed, may have constituted a possible third noun class. Otherwise it may have been derived from a derivational suffix.

In general, most uninflected nouns are considered singular, though there are a handful of exceptions; these exceptions became more widespread among modern Tungusic languages found in Manchuria. Pluralization was usually achieved with the suffix *-l in words ending in a vowel, as in the plural *biral ('rivers') from the singular form *bira, or with *-r if the stem was in the unstable n group, as in the plural *murir ('horses') from the singular form *murin. A small set of words that end in a consonant also show the *-l pluralization strategy with an epenthetic *-I-; for example, the dialectal Evenki word дю̄г (juug, 'house') is pluralized as дю̄гил (juugil). While no longer productive in modern Tungusic languages, vestiges of this system are still present in words like *jöör ('two') show the pluralizing final *-r.

=== Possession ===
Like its descendants, Proto-Tungusic marked for alienable and inalienable possession; alienable possessions were marked with the infix *-ŋU-, as in *dïlïbï ('my [own] head') and *dïlïŋubï ('the head [e.g., of an animal] that belongs to me'). (Note: Compare Nanai дилии (jɪlɪɪ) and дилиӈгои (jɪlɪŋgoɪ) with the same meanings.) The marker could also be used in a proprietive sense to mean having something of one's own rather than having someone else's possession. This was also probably related to the genitive marker *-ŋII-, which also appears in some possessive pronouns; this form may have been derived from an earlier form *-ŋU-(y)I.

== Syntax ==
The syntax of Proto-Tungusic is somewhat difficult to discern, in part because the Jurchenic languages are more analytical than the other subfamilies, but features shared across modern Tungusic languages are thought to have existed during the Proto-Tungusic period. The proto-language is thought to have had subject–object–verb (SOV) as its constituent word order, though there was probably some flexibility based on its case and person marking. Its structure for nominal phrases was head final.

Polar questions were formed through a clitic and, while Ulch and some other modern descendants mark for non-polar questions with a "corrogative" clitic, this is not believed to have been present in Proto-Tungusic. The language usually employed converbs for clause chaining in complex sentences, though some "quasiconverbs" and "converbally used participles" also marked subordinate clauses. Negation was handled with the specific verb *e- and its irregular imperative *eji. The use of the copula *bi- in equative sentences was probably optional if no tense, aspect, mood, or person were marked for; otherwise, it appears to have been mandatory.

== See also ==
- Ancient Northern East Asian
- Genetic history of East Asians
- Identity in the Eight Banners
- Proto-Chukotko-Kamchatkan language
- Proto-Samoyedic language
