= Proto-Nahuan language =

Reconstructed ancestor of the Nahuan languages

Proto-Nahuan
- Proto-Aztecan
- Reconstruction of: Nahuan languages
- Reconstructed ancestor: Proto-Uto-Aztecan

Proto-Nahuan (also called Proto-Aztecan) is a hypothetical daughter language of the Proto-Uto-Aztecan language. It is the common ancestor from which the modern Nahuan languages have developed.

== Homeland ==
There is some controversy about where and when Proto-Nahuan was spoken. Following Nahuan ethnohistorical sources describing a southward migration of Nahuatl speakers, as well as the fact that all other Uto-Aztecan languages are north of the Nahuan languages, the homeland has traditionally been considered to be located to the north of the current area of extension.

An alternative hypothesis by Jane H. Hill is that Proto-Nahuatl arose within Mesoamerica, and the Nahuas are the only remainders after a large-scale northward migration.

== Phonology ==
The following phonological changes are shared by all Nahuan languages:

- Proto-Uto-Aztecan *t becomes Proto-Nahuan lateral affricate *t͡ɬ before Proto-Uto-Aztecan *a and before some cases of PUA *u/Corachol-Nahua *ɨ (Proto-Uto-Aztecan *taːka 'man' becomes Proto-Nahuan *tlaːka-tl 'man').
- Proto-Uto-Aztecan *p is reduced to h in the onset of unstressed syllables in proto-Corachol-Nahuan, and initial h is subsequently lost in Proto-Nahuan (Proto-Uto-Aztecan *pahi 'water' becomes Proto-Nahuan *aː-tla 'water').
- Proto-Uto-Aztecan *u becomes *ɨ in proto-Corachol-Nahuan and merges with *i and *e in Proto-Nahuan *i (Proto-Uto-Aztecan *muki 'to die' becomes Proto-Nahuan *miki 'to die', proto-Uto-Aztecan *hupa 'skunk' becomes proto-Nahuan *hepa 'skunk').
- Proto-Uto-Aztecan sibilants *ts and *s are palatalized before *i, causing a split into *ts/*tʃ and *s/*ʃ, respectively.
- Proto-Uto-Aztecan's fifth vowel, reconstructed as *ɨ or *ə, merged with *e in Proto-Corachol-Nahuan *e (Proto-Uto-Aztecan *nɨmi 'to walk' becomes Proto-Nahuan *nemi 'to live, to walk').
- Many metatheses in which Proto-Uto-Aztecan roots of the shape *CVCV become *VCCV (Proto-Uto-Aztecan *puːli 'to tie' becomes Proto-Nahuan *ilpi 'to tie').

== Morphology ==
Proto-Nahuan was an agglutinative language, and its words used suffix complexes for a variety of purposes, with several morphemes strung together.

== Lexicon ==
Some Proto-Aztecan (i.e., Proto-Nahuan) reconstructions by Davletshin (2012):

gloss	Proto-Aztecan
all (todos)	*mochɨ-m
ashes	*nɨx-tlɨ
bark	*ɨwaː-yoː-tl
belly	*-ɨhtɨ
big	*wehey(ɨ)
bird	*toːtoː-tl
bite	*-kɨh-tzoma
black	*tliːl-tɨ-k
blood	*ɨs-tlɨ
bone	*oːmɨ-tl
breast	*-chiːchiːwal
burn tr.	*-tla-tɨ-ha
claw (nail)	*-ɨstɨ
cloud	*mix-tlɨ
cold	*sese-k
come	*wiːtz (preterit-as-present form)
die	*mɨki
drink	*-ihi
dry	*waːk
ear	*nakas-tlɨ
earth	*tlaːl-lɨ
eat	*-kwa-haː
eye	*-iːx
feather	*-ɨ?wɨ
fire	*tlahi-tl
fish	*mɨ-chɨ-m
fly	*patlaːni
foot	*-ɨkxɨ
full	*teːn-tok
give tr.	*-maka
good	*yeːk-tlɨ
hair	*-tzom
hand	*-mah
head	*-kwah
hear	*-kaki
heart	*-yoːl
I	*naha
kill	*mɨk-tɨ-ha
knee	*-tlan-kwah
know	*mati
leaf	*ɨswa-tl
lie	*mo-teːka
long	*weheya-k
louse	*atɨmɨ-tl
man	*tlaːka-tl
many	*mɨyak
meat	*naka-tl
moon	*meːtz-tlɨ
mountain	*tɨpeː-tl
mouth	*teːn-tlɨ
name	*toːkaːhɨ-tl
neck	*kəch-tlɨ
new	*yankwi-k
night	*yowal-lɨ
nose	*yaka-tl
one	*seː(m)
red	*chiːl-tɨ-k ?
road	*oh-tlɨ
root	*nelwa-tl ?
round	*yawal-tɨ-k ?
sand	*xaːl-lɨ
see	*-ɨhta
seed	*aːch-tlɨ
sit	*mo-tlalɨ-ha
skin	*eːwa-tl
sleep	*kochɨ
smoke	*poːk-tlɨ ?
stand	*kɨtza
star	*sitlalɨ-m
stone	*tə-tl
tail	*-kwitla-pɨl
that	*oːn- ?
this	*in- ?
thou	*təha
tongue	*-nɨnɨ-pɨl
tooth	*-tlan
tree	*kwa-wɨ-tl
two	*oːmə
walk (go)	*nɨh-nɨmi
warm (hot)	*to-toːnɨ-k ?
water	*aː-tl
we	*təha-mɨ-t
what	*tla-(hi ?)
white	*istaː-kɨ ?
who	*aːk
woman	*si/owaː-tl
yellow	*kos-tɨ-k ?

== Sources ==
- Campbell, Lyle; Ronald Langacker (1978). "Proto-Aztecan vowels: Part I". International Journal of American Linguistics. 44 (2). Chicago: University of Chicago Press: 85–102. doi:10.1086/465526. OCLC 1753556. S2CID 143091460.
- Dakin, Karen (1982). La evolución fonológica del Protonáhuatl (in Spanish). México D.F.: Universidad Nacional Autónoma de México, Instituto de Investigaciones Filológicas. ISBN 968-5802-92-0. OCLC 10216962.
- Dakin, Karen (1983). "Proto-Aztecan vowels and Pochutec: an alternative analysis". International Journal of American Linguistics. 49 (2): 196–203. doi:10.1086/465782. S2CID 143920332.
- Davletshin, Albert (2012). "Proto-Uto-Aztecans on their way to the Proto-Aztecan homeland: linguistic evidence" (PDF). Journal of Language Relationship. 8 (8): 75–92. doi:10.31826/jlr-2012-080106.
- Langacker, Ronald W. (1977). An overview of Uto-Aztecan grammar. Dallas, TX: Summer Institute of Linguistics. ISBN 0-88312-070-4.
- Pharao Hansen, Magnus (2024). "Sapir's Law and the Role Of Accent in the Reconstruction of Proto-Corachol-Nahuan". International Journal of American Linguistics. 90 (2): 227–267. doi:10.1086/728639.
- Voegelin, C. F.; Voegelin, F.; Hale, K. (1962). Typological and Comparative Grammar of Uto-Aztecan: Phonology. Memoirs of the International Journal of American Linguistics. Vol. 17. Waverly Press.
