= Proto-Mongolic language =

Common ancestor of the Mongolic languages

Proto-Mongolic
- Reconstruction of: Mongolic languages
- Region: Manchuria - East Mongolia
- Era: Developed into Middle Mongol after the thirteenth century, after geographical dispersal of the ancient Mongols under Chinggis Khan and his heirs
- Reconstructed ancestor: Proto-Serbi-Mongolic?

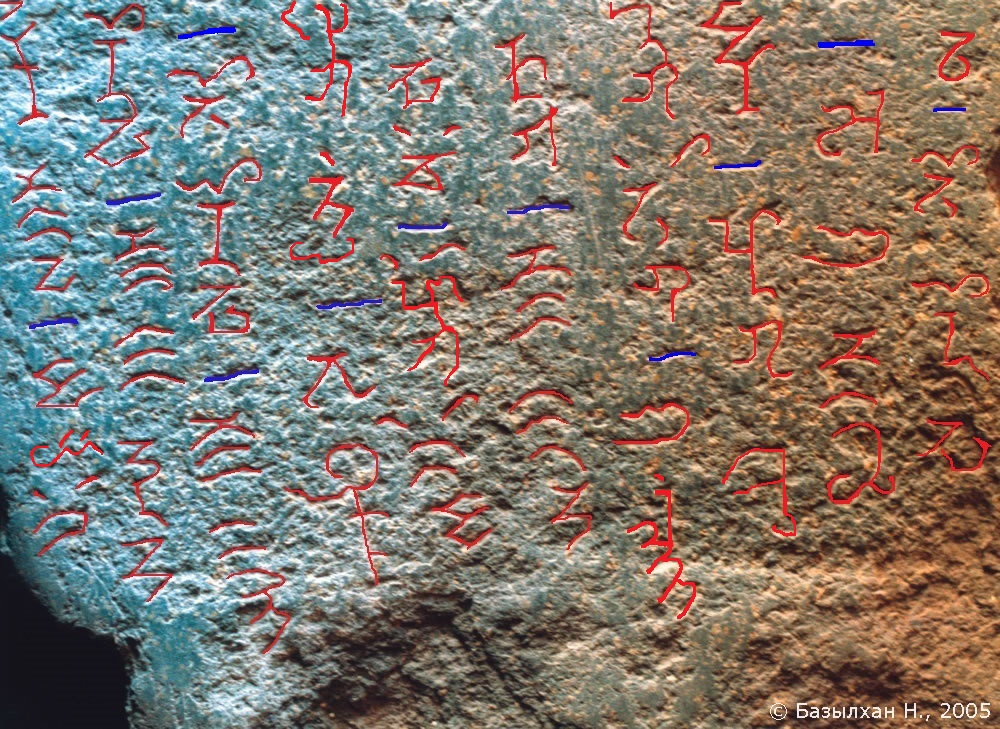
The Hüis Tolgoi inscription, written in a Proto-Mongolic language, Mongolia.

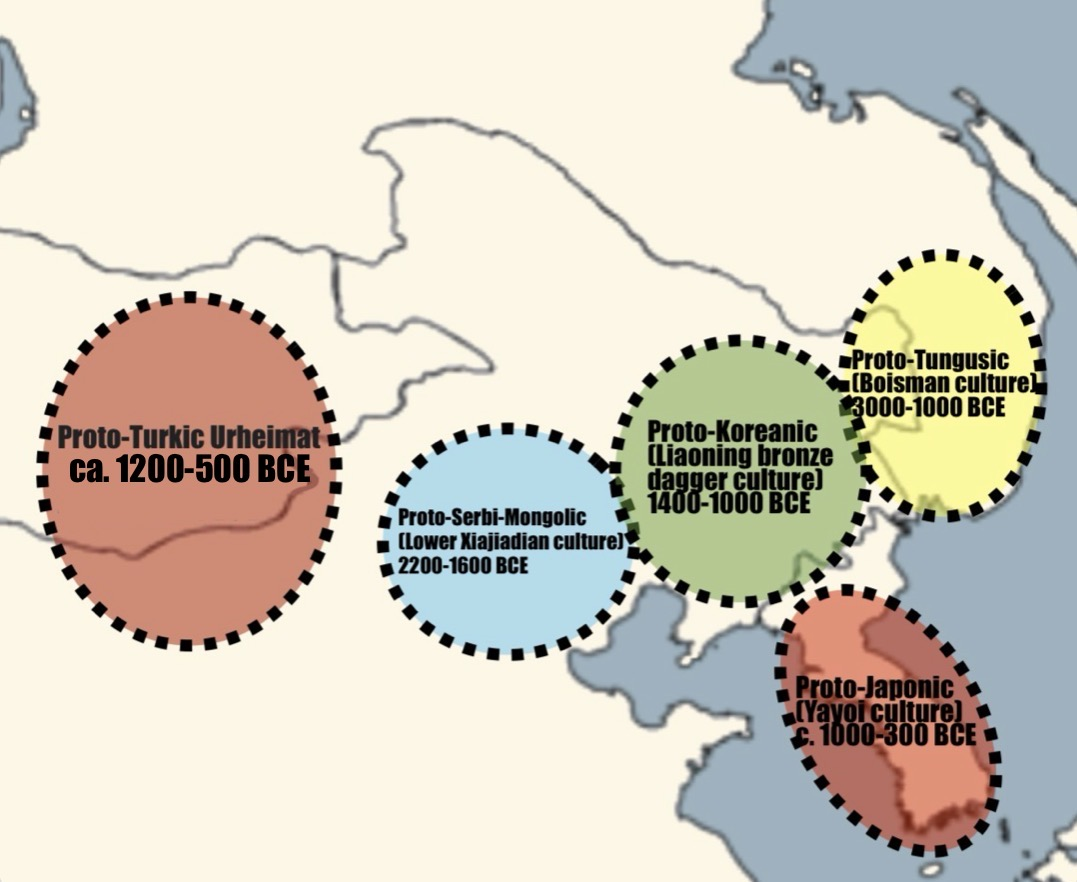
This map shows the most likely location of the Urheimats of the proposed Altaic languages, with Proto-Serbi-Mongolic. Proto-Serbi-Mongolic probably originated in the Lower Xiajiadian culture.

Proto-Mongolic is the hypothetical ancestor language of the modern Mongolic languages. It is very close to the Middle Mongol language, the language spoken at the time of Genghis Khan and the Mongol Empire. Most features of modern Mongolic languages can thus be shown to descend from Middle Mongol. An exception would be the Common Mongolic pluritative voice suffix -cAgA- 'do together', which can be reconstructed from the modern languages but is not attested in Middle Mongol.

Regarding the time period when Proto-Mongolic was spoken, Juha Janhunen writes: "The absolute dating of Proto-Mongolic depends on when, exactly, the linguistic unity of its speakers ended", that is, when it evolved into separate Mongolic languages; this event took place "only after the geographical dispersal of the ancient Mongols under Chinggis Khan", which was "not earlier than the thirteenth century." As a result, "[t]his means that the present-day differences between the Mongolic languages are likely to be the result of less than 800 years of divergent evolution."

== Phonology ==
Vowels
| | Front Unrounded | Front Rounded | Back |
|---|---|---|---|
| High | *i | *ü /y/ | *u |
| Mid | *e | *ö /ø/ | *o |
| Low | *a | | |

Consonants
| | | Labial | Alveolar | Palatal | Velar |
|---|---|---|---|---|---|
| Nasal | | *m | *n | | *ŋ |
| Stop | fortis | | *t | *c /t͡ʃ/ | *k |
| Stop | lenis | *b | *d | *j /d͡ʒ/ | *g |
| Fricative | | | *s | | *x /h/ |
| Vibrant | | | *r | | |
| Approximants | | | *l | *y /j/ | |

== Morphology ==
=== Plurals ===
One way in which Proto-Mongolic formed plurals was by adding -s or -ud to a word. -s would be added to words ending in vowels, for example ere (man) would become eres. -ud would be added to words ending in consonants, for example nom (book) would become nomud. However, for words ending with the consonant n, l, or r would lose the final letter, and just add d, for example kan (prince) would become kad (princes).

== Lexicon ==
Numbers
| 1 | *nike(n) |
| 2 | *koxar |
| 3 | *gurba(n) |
| 4 | *dörbe(n) |
| 5 | *tabu(n) |
| 6 | *jirguxa(n) |
| 7 | *doluxa(n) |
| 8 | *na(y)ima(n) |
| 9 | *yersü(n) |
| 10 | *xarba(n) |
| 20 | *kori(n) |
| 30 | *guci(n) |
| 40 | *döci(n) |
| 50 | *tabi(n) |
| 60 | *jira(n) |
| 70 | *dala(n) |
| 80 | *naya(n) |
| 90 | *yere(n) |
| 100 | *jaxu(n) |
| 1000 | *minga(n) |
