= Historical glottometry =

Historical glottometry is a method used in historical linguistics. It is a quantitative, non-cladistic approach to language subgrouping.

The aim of historical glottometry (HG) is to address the limitations of the tree model when applied to dialect continua and linkages. It acknowledges that the genealogical structure of a linkage typically consists of entangled subgroups, and provides ways to reconstruct that internal structure by measuring the relative strength of these subgroups.

This approach was developed by Alexandre François (CNRS) and Siva Kalyan (ANU). While the method was initially applied to Oceanic languages, in recent years it has been applied to a much broader range of language families.

== Rationale ==
Historical Glottometry grew out of the observation that a large number of language families in the world form linkages (a term coined by Malcolm Ross), i.e. they evolved out of former dialect continua in which historical innovations tend to overlap. Such linkages do not conform with the Tree model often used in historical linguistics, which presupposes that innovations should be nested. This common situation is better approached using the Wave model.

Inspired by dialectometry, the aim of Historical Glottometry is to provide an alternative, non-cladistic approach to language genealogy, while remaining true to the principles of the Comparative method developed by Neogrammarians in the 19th century.

== Principles of the method ==
The fundamental principles of Historical Glottometry include the following:

1. each subgroup is defined by exclusively shared innovations (a principle first expressed by Leskien [1876]), i.e. linguistic synapomorphies;
2. subgroups are allowed to intersect (as expected under the Wave model);
3. the “strength” of each subgroup is measured on a continuous scale (rather than subgroups simply being absent or present). That strength is assessed using two ratings, named cohesiveness and subgroupiness.

== Glottometric diagrams ==
One of the outputs of Historical Glottometry takes the form of a “glottometric diagram”. Such diagrams are analogous to the isogloss maps used in dialectology, except that each isogloss refers not to a single innovation but to a set of languages defined by one or more exclusively-shared innovations — that is, a genealogical subgroup.

The glottometric diagram represents graphically the strength of each subgroup. Thus, the contour's thickness can be made proportional to the rate of “cohesiveness” or “subgroupiness” calculated for that subgroup. The homepage of Historical Glottometry includes an example of a glottometric diagram, based on a study of the Torres–Banks linkage in Vanuatu.

Glottometric results can also be displayed in the form of Neighbornets, or of glottometric maps.

== Applications to particular language families ==
Several studies have been conducted, partly or entirely within the framework of Historical glottometry – including the following:

- on the Torres–Banks linkage, a group of Oceanic languages from Vanuatu (François 2014, 2017; Kalyan & François 2018);
- on Sogeram languages, a subgroup of the Madang family from Papua New Guinea (Daniels et al. 2019);
- on the dialects of Boni, a subgroup of Cushitic languages from Kenya and Somalia (Elias 2019);
- on Arabic dialects of Egypt and Sudan (Leddy-Cecere 2021);
- on Numic languages, a subgroup of Uto-Aztecan languages from North America (Rannap 2017);
- on Enlhet–Enenlhet languages, a group of languages spoken in Paraguay (van Gysel 2017);
- on early Germanic languages (Agee 2018);
- on the dialects of Old English (Den Hertog 2024).

== Historical glottometry and incomplete lineage sorting ==
Jacques & List (2019) show that the concept of incomplete lineage sorting can be applied to account for non-treelike phenomena in language evolution. Kalyan and François (2019) concur that "Historical Glottometry does not challenge the family tree model once incomplete lineage sorting has been taken into account" – provided the internal variation discussed in the analysis includes the geographical (dialectal) dimension.

== See also ==
- Comparative method
- Dialectology
- Dialectometry
- Genetic relationship (linguistics)
- Linkage (linguistics)
- Wave model
