= Protoform =

A protoform may refer to:

- a putative word that historical linguists have reconstructed in a specific proto-language, by following principles of the Comparative method.
- an element of the fictional universe of Transformers. It is the building blocks of all life on Cybertron in Transformers: Animated.
