= Daughter language =

Language considered as derived from another (parent)

In historical linguistics, a daughter language, also known as descendant language, is a language descended from another language, its mother language, through a process of genetic descent. If more than one language has developed from the same proto-language, or 'mother language', those languages are said to be sister languages, members of the same language family. These concepts are linked to the tree model of language evolution, in which the relationships between languages are compared with those between members of a family tree. This model captures the diversification of languages from a common source.

Strictly speaking, the metaphor of the mother-daughter relationship can lead to a misunderstanding of language history, as daughter languages are direct continuations of the mother language, which have become distinct, principally by a process of gradual change; the languages are not separate entities "born" to a parent who eventually dies.

Mother languages do not "die", they generally become their daughter languages. This need not necessarily be the case, as is evidenced by the coexistence of Afrikaans and Dutch.

== Examples ==
- Modern Standard Urdu and Modern Standard Hindi are both standardized registers of the Hindustani language (which is the mother language). Apart from the formal vocabulary and scripts, both languages are mutually intelligible.
- Malayalam is a daughter language of Old Malayalam, which is a daughter language of Middle Tamil, which is a daughter language of Proto-South-Dravidian which is a daughter language of Proto-Dravidian.
- English is a daughter language of Old English, which is a daughter language of Proto-Germanic, which is a daughter language of Proto-Indo-European.
- Italian, Spanish, French, Portuguese, and Romanian are all daughter languages of Latin, which is a daughter language of Proto-Italic, which is a daughter language of Proto-Indo-European.
- Mandarin Chinese is a daughter language of Old Mandarin, which is a daughter language of Old Chinese, which is a daughter language of Proto-Sino-Tibetan.
- Bulgarian is a daughter language of Old Bulgarian, which is a daughter language of Proto-Slavic, which is a daughter language of Proto-Indo-European.
- German and Yiddish are both daughter languages of Old High German, which is a daughter language of Proto-Germanic, which is a daughter language of Proto-Indo-European.
- Afrikaans is a daughter language of Dutch, which is a daughter language of Low Franconian, which is a daughter language of Proto-Germanic, which is a daughter language of Proto-Indo-European.
- Japanese is a daughter language of Old Japanese, which is a daughter language of Proto-Japonic.
- Coptic is a daughter language of Ancient Egyptian (through its many stages), which is a daughter language of Proto-Afroasiatic.
- Maltese is a daughter language of Siculo-Arabic, which is a daughter language of Old Arabic, which is a daughter language of Proto-Semitic, which is a daughter language of Proto-Afroasiatic.
- Hiligaynon and Cebuano are daughter languages of Proto-Visayan, which is a daughter language of Proto-Philippine, which is a daughter language of Proto-Malayo-Polynesian, which is a daughter language of Proto-Austronesian.
- Turkish is a daughter language of Ottoman Turkish, which is a daughter language of Old Anatolian Turkish, which is a daughter language of Oghuz, which is a daughter language of Proto-Common Turkic, which is a daughter language of Proto-Turkic.

== See also ==
- Comparative method
- Language families
- Proto-language
- Tree model
