= Hugo Schuchardt =

German linguist (1842–1927)

Hugo Ernst Mario Schuchardt (German: [ˈhuːɡo ˈʃʊxaʁt]; 4 February 1842, Gotha (Thuringia) – 21 April 1927, Graz (Styria)) was a German linguist, best known for his work in the Romance languages, the Basque language, and today especially as a pioneer in the study of contact languages, including pidgins, creoles, and the Lingua franca of the Mediterranean.

== In Germany ==
Schuchardt grew up in Gotha. From 1859 to 1864, he studied in Jena and Bonn with many important linguists of the time, notably August Schleicher and Kuno Fischer in Jena, as well as Friedrich Ritschl and Otto Jahn in Bonn. In 1864, Schuchardt earned a doctorate with a dissertation entitled De sermonis Romani plebei vocalibus ('On the vowels of Vulgar Latin'). Based upon a perusal of "an incredible amount of texts never really considered before him", it was subsequently published 1866-1868 in a three-volume German language edition as Der Vokalismus des Vulgärlateins (The Vowels of Vulgar Latin).

In 1870, Schuchardt was promoted to professor ('habilitation') at the University of Leipzig, and in 1873, he became professor of Romance philology at the University of Halle, which was then a stronghold of the neogrammarians. Meanwhile, Schuchardt primarily worked on traditional topics in Romance philology with a strong historic orientation but also developed an interest in language contact and language mixing (as found in mixed languages and creole languages).

== Moving to Graz, Austria ==
In 1876, Schuchardt became chair for Romance Philology at the University of Graz, with the help of Johannes Schmidt. He did field work in Wales (1875) and Spain (1879) where he collected material for his Celtic and Basque/Romance research. Schuchardt became interested in two new fields, creole and Basque linguistics, thereby becoming a respected forefather of both linguistic subdisciplines. He is also one of the first linguists to have promulgated seriously the idea that creole languages are in no way inferior to other languages, which can best be seen in his appreciative discussions of creoles without disparaging assessments. At least one remnant of the equality question - whether creoles have a separate developmental route or develop along a universal trajectory with other languages - are still debated. With his 1888 publication "Auf Anlass des Volapüks" he promoted the creation of a new auxiliary world language for all nations. In the same period (1885), he published an influential critique of the methods of the neogrammarians with the title "Über die Lautgesetze. Gegen die Junggrammatiker".

Schuchardt may be most eminent as a vascologist. In 1887, L.L. Bonaparte arranged Schuchardt's journey to the village of Sara (Labourd, Basses Pyrénées), where he did field work and seems to have learned Basque. Following this journey, he published numerous (>100!) works on Basque and Romano-Basque, but he never returned to the Basque Country. In various publications, Schuchardt discussed possible relationships of Basque with other language families—today Basque is known as a language isolate. Schuchardt firmly sided with the outdated viewpoint of the Vasco-Iberian hypothesis, in stark contrast to his earlier open-mindedness.

Similarly, in the discussion on ergativity, then-current, Schuchardt firmly defended the idea of the ergative construction as an obligatorily-passive clause (as opposed to a similarly questionable theory of the ergative construction being a nominalized clause). He thus specifically opposed Nikolaus Finck in Vienna with whom he had a scientific dispute in a succession of articles (e.g, N. Finck (1907), "Der angeblich passivische Charakter des transitiven Verbs", Zeitschrift für vergleichende Sprachforschung 41:209-282).

== Late period ==
Although Schuchardt was invited to professorships in Budapest and Leipzig (around 1890), he refused to leave Graz. In 1900, however, Schuchardt retired early from his chair. Being then free from his teaching duties, he undertook extended trips to Southern Italy, Egypt, and Scandinavia. He built a villa in Graz (Johann Fux Gasse nr. 30) for himself and his extensive library, and named it 'Villa Malvine', after his beloved mother (Malvine von Bridel-Brideri).

The last two decades of his life, he worked predominantly on Basque. Disappointed by the "unjust peace" following World War I, Italian irredentism and French nationalism ('chauvinism'), he was no longer interested in Romance research, partly even giving up contacts with colleagues from these countries. In an article (Bekenntnisse und Erkenntnisse 1919), he gives some oral history insights into his youth and historic events of that time as well as his viewpoint of the outcome of World War I.

== Schuchardt today ==
Hugo Schuchardt is one of the most eminent linguists of the Germanic tradition within Romance philology. Today his contribution is mainly of historiographic interest. For the Basque community, he is one of the most eminent foreign scholars, beside Wilhelm von Humboldt and only few others.

His library became part of the university library of Graz; his 'Villa Malvine' hosted the Romance philology department for a long time, but is today an administrative building of the university. Researchers in Graz have constantly worked on Schuchardt ever since, among them Michaela Wolf and the linguist Bernhard Hurch (himself being a bascologist with a strong interest in historiography of linguistics) who compiled an online archive of the entire work of Schuchardt (see external links).

His most lasting contributions to modern linguistics, though, are the elaboration, with Johannes Schmidt, of the Wave Model of language change and his substantial work laying the foundations of modern creolistics.
