= Linkage (linguistics) =

Group of related languages

In historical linguistics, a linkage is a network of related dialects or languages that formed from a gradual diffusion and differentiation of a proto-language.

The term was introduced by Malcolm Ross in his study of Western Oceanic languages (Ross 1988). It is contrasted with a family, which arises when the proto-language speech community separates into groups that remain isolated from each other and do not form a network.

== Principle ==
Linkages are formed when languages emerged historically from the diversification of an earlier dialect continuum. Its members may have diverged despite sharing subsequent innovations, or such dialects may have come into contact and so converged. (Note: Ross's concept of a linkage differs from R. M. W. Dixon, who posits that over long periods, unrelated languages in contact may converge until they appear to be related (this concept is closer to what is otherwise known as a Sprachbund or areal features).) In any dialect continuum, innovations are shared between neighbouring dialects in intersecting patterns. The patterns of intersecting innovations continue to be evident as the dialect continuum turns into a linkage.

According to the comparative method, a group of languages that exclusively shares a set of innovations constitutes a "(genealogical) subgroup". A linkage is thus usually characterised by the presence of intersecting subgroups. The tree model does not allow for the existence of intersecting subgroups and so is ill-suited to represent linkages, which are better approached using the wave model.

The cladistic approach underlying the tree model requires the common ancestor of each subgroup to be discontiguous from other related languages and unable to share any innovation with them after their "separation". That assumption is absent from Ross and François's approach to linkages. Their genealogical subgroups also have languages descended from a common ancestor, as defined by a set of exclusively-shared innovations), but whose common ancestor may not have been discretely separated from its neighbours. For example, a chain of dialects {A B C D E F} may undergo a number of linguistic innovations, some affecting {BCD}, others {CDE}, still others {DEF}. Insofar as each set of dialects was mutually intelligible at the time of the innovations, all can be seen as forming separate languages. Among them, Proto-BCD will be the language ancestral to the subgroup BCD, Proto-CDE the language ancestral to CDE and so on. As for the language descended from dialect D, it will belong simultaneously to three "intersecting subgroups" (BCD, CDE and DEF).

In both the tree and the linkage approaches, genealogical subgroups are strictly defined by their shared inheritance from a common ancestor. Simply, although trees entail that all proto-languages must be discretely separated, the linkage model avoids that assumption. François also claims that a tree can be considered a special case of a linkage in which all subgroups happen to be nested and temporally ordered from broadest to narrowest.

In order to unravel the genealogical structure of linkages, Kalyan and François have designed a dedicated quantitative method, named Historical glottometry.

== Examples ==
An example of a linkage is the one formed by the Central Malayo-Polynesian languages of the Banda Sea (a sea in the South Moluccas in Indonesia). The Central–Eastern Malayo-Polynesian languages are commonly divided into two branches, Central Malayo-Polynesian and Eastern Malayo-Polynesian, each having certain defining features that unify them and distinguish them from the other. However, whereas Proto-Eastern and Proto-Central–Eastern Malayo-Polynesian can be reconstructed (the sibling and the parent of Central Malayo-Polynesian, respectively), a Proto-Central Malayo-Polynesian language reconstruction, distinct from Proto-Central-Eastern Malayo-Polynesian does not seem feasible.

It may be that the branches of Central Malayo-Polynesian are each as old as Eastern Malayo-Polynesian but that they went on to exchange features that are now considered to define them as a family. The features common to Eastern Malayo-Polynesian can be assumed to have been present in a single ancestral language, but that is not the case for Central Malayo-Polynesian.

This scenario does not amount to a denial of a common ancestry of the Central Malayo-Polynesian languages. It is only a reinterpretation of the age of the relationship to be just as old as their relationship to Eastern Malayo-Polynesian.

François (2014, p. 171) suggests that most of the world's language families are really linkages that are made up of intersecting, not nested, subgroups. He cites the Oceanic languages of northern Vanuatu as well as those of Fiji and of Polynesia and at least some sections of the Pama-Nyungan, Athabaskan, Semitic, Sinitic, and Indo-European families.

Within Indo-European, Indo-Aryan, Western Romance and Germanic, in turn, form linkages of their own.

== See also ==
- Areal feature
- Historical glottometry
- Language contact

== Sources ==
- François, Alexandre (2014), "Trees, Waves and Linkages: Models of Language Diversification" (PDF), in Bowern, Claire; Evans, Bethwyn (eds.), The Routledge Handbook of Historical Linguistics, London: Routledge, pp. 161–189, ISBN 978-0-41552-789-7, archived from the original on 27 February 2025.
- Heggarty, Paul; Maguire, Warren; McMahon, April (2010). "Splits or waves? Trees or webs? How divergence measures and network analysis can unravel language histories". Philosophical Transactions of the Royal Society B. 365 (1559): 3829–3843. doi:10.1098/rstb.2010.0099. PMC 2981917. PMID 21041208.
- Kalyan, Siva; François, Alexandre (2018), "Freeing the Comparative Method from the tree model: A framework for Historical Glottometry" (PDF), in Kikusawa, Ritsuko; Reid, Laurie (eds.), Let's Talk about Trees: Genetic relationships of languages and their phylogenic representation, Senri Ethnological Studies, 98, Ōsaka: National Museum of Ethnology, pp. 59–89.
- Lynch, John; Malcolm Ross; Terry Crowley (2002). The Oceanic languages. Richmond, Surrey: Curzon. ISBN 978-0-7007-1128-4. OCLC 48929366.
- Ross, Malcolm D. (1988). Proto Oceanic and the Austronesian languages of Western Melanesia. Canberra: Pacific Linguistics.
