= Internal reconstruction =

Method of reconstructing an earlier state in a language's history

In historical linguistics, internal reconstruction is a method of reconstructing an earlier state in a language's history using only evidence internal to the language in question.

The comparative method compares variations between languages, such as in sets of cognates, under the assumption that they descend from a single proto-language, but internal reconstruction compares variant forms within a single language under the assumption that they descend from a single, regular form. For example, they could take the form of allomorphs of the same morpheme.

The basic premise of internal reconstruction is that a meaning-bearing element that alternates between two or more similar forms in different environments was probably once a single form into which alternation has been introduced by the usual mechanisms of sound change and analogy.

Language forms that are reconstructed by internal reconstruction are denoted with the pre- prefix, as in Pre-Old Japanese, like the use of proto- to indicate a language reconstructed by means of the comparative method, as in Proto-Indo-European. (However, the pre- prefix is sometimes used for an unattested prior stage of a language, without reference to internal reconstruction.)

It is possible to apply internal reconstruction even to proto-languages reconstructed by the comparative method. For example, performing internal reconstruction on Proto-Mayan would yield Pre-Proto-Mayan. In some cases, it is also desirable to use internal reconstruction to uncover an earlier form of various languages and then submit those pre- languages to the comparative method. Care must be taken, however, because internal reconstruction performed on languages before the comparative method is applied can remove significant evidence of the earlier state of the language and thus reduce the accuracy of the reconstructed proto-language.

== Role in historical linguistics ==
When undertaking a comparative study of an underanalyzed language family, one should understand its systems of alternations, if any, before one tackles the greater complexities of analyzing entire linguistic structures. For example, Type A forms of verbs in Samoan are the citation forms, which are in dictionaries and word lists, but in making historical comparisons with other Austronesian languages, one should not use Samoan citation forms that have missing parts. (An analysis of the verb sets would alert the researcher to the certainty that many other words in Samoan have lost a final consonant.)

In other words, internal reconstruction gives access to an earlier stage, at least in some details, of the languages being compared, which can be valuable since the more time has passed, the more changes have been accumulated in the structure of a living language. Thus, the earliest known attestations of languages should be used with the comparative method.

Internal reconstruction, when it is not a sort of preliminary to the application of the comparative method, is most useful if the analytic power of the comparative method is unavailable, especially in language isolates.

Internal reconstruction can also draw limited inferences from peculiarities of distribution. Even before comparative investigations had sorted out the true history of Indo-Iranian phonology, some scholars had wondered if the extraordinary frequency of the phoneme /a/ in Sanskrit – 20% of all phonemes together – might point to some historical fusion of two or more vowels. (In fact, it represents the final outcome of five different Proto-Indo-European syllabics whose syllabic states of /m/ and /n/ can be discerned by the application of internal reconstruction.) However, in such cases, internal analysis is better at raising questions than at answering them. The extraordinary frequency of /a/ in Sanskrit hints at some sort of historical event but does not and cannot lead to any specific theory.

== Issues and shortcomings ==
=== Neutralizing environments ===
One issue in internal reconstruction is neutralizing environments, which can be an obstacle to historically correct analysis. Consider the following forms from Spanish, spelled phonemically rather than orthographically:

Infinitive		Third person singular
bolbér	(re)turn	buélbe
probár	test	pruéba
dormír	sleep	duérme
morír	die	muére
ponér	place	póne
doblár	fold	dóbla
goθár	enjoy	góθa
korrér	run	kórre

One pattern of inflection shows alternation between /o/ and /ue/; the other type has /o/ throughout. Since those lexical items are all basic, not technical, high-register or obvious borrowings, their behavior is likely to be a matter of inheritance from an earlier system, rather than the result of some native pattern overlaid by a borrowed one. (An example of such an overlay would be the non-alternating English privative prefix un- compared to the alternating privative prefix in borrowed Latinate forms, in-, im, ir-, il-.)

One might guess that the difference between the two sets can be explained by two different native markers of the third-person singular, but a basic principle of linguistic analysis is that one cannot and should not try to analyze data that one does not have. Also, positing such a history violates the principle of parsimony (Occam's Razor) by unnecessarily adding a complication to the analysis whose chief result is to restate the observed data as a sort of historical fact. That is, the result of the analysis is the same as the input. As it happens, the forms as given yield readily to real analysis and so there is no reason to look elsewhere.

The first assumption is that in pairs like bolbér/buélbe, the root vowels were originally the same. There are two possibilities: either something happened to make an original */o/ turn into two different sounds in the third-person singular, or the distinction in the third-singular is original and the vowels of the infinitives are in what is called a neutralizing environment (if an original contrast is lost because two or more elements "fall together", or coalesce into one). There is no way of predicting when /o/ breaks to /ué/ and when it remains /ó/ in the third-person singular. On the other hand, starting with /ó/ and /ué/, one can write an unambiguous rule for the infinitive forms: /ué/ becomes /o/. One might notice further, upon looking at other Spanish forms, that the nucleus /ue/ is found only in stressed syllables even other than in verb forms.

That analysis gains plausibility from the observation that the neutralizing environment is unstressed, but the nuclei are different in stressed syllables. That fits with vowel contrasts often being preserved differently in stressed and unstressed environments and that the usual relationship is that there are more contrasts in stressed syllables than in unstressed ones since previously-distinctive vowels fell together in unstressed environments.

The idea that original */ue/ might fall together with original */o/ is unproblematic and so internally, a complex nucleus *ue can be reconstructed that remains distinct when it is stressed and coalesces with *o when it is unstressed.

However, the true history is quite different: there were no diphthongs in Proto-Romance. There was an *o (reflecting Latin ŭ and ō) and an *ɔ (reflecting Latin ŏ). In Spanish the two fell together in unstressed syllables, as in all other Romance languages, but *ɔ broke into the complex nucleus /ue/ in stressed syllables. Internal reconstruction accurately points to two different historical nuclei in unstressed /o/ but gets the details wrong.

=== Shared innovations ===
When applying internal reconstruction to related languages prior to applying the comparative method, one must check that the analysis does not remove the shared innovations that characterize subgroups. An example is consonant gradation in Finnish, Estonian, and Sami. A pre-gradation phonology can be derived for each of the three groups by internal reconstruction, but it was actually an innovation in the Finnic branch of Uralic, rather than the individual languages. Indeed, it was one of the innovations defining that branch. That fact would be missed if the comparanda of the Uralic family included as primary data the "degraded" states of Finnish, Estonian, and Sami.

=== Lost conditioning factors ===
Not all synchronic alternation is amenable to internal reconstruction. Even if a secondary split (see phonological change) often results in alternations that signal a historical split, the conditions involved are usually immune to recovery by internal reconstruction. For example, the alternation of voiced and voiceless fricatives in Germanic languages, as described in Verner's law, cannot be explained only by examining the Germanic forms themselves.

Despite that general characteristic of secondary split, internal reconstruction can occasionally work. A primary split is, in principle, recoverable by internal reconstruction whenever it results in alternations, but later changes can make the conditioning irrecoverable.

== Examples ==
=== English ===
English has two patterns for forming the past tense in roots ending in apical stops: /t d/.

Type I
Present	Past
adapt	adapted
fret	fretted
greet	greeted
note	noted
reflect	reflected
regret	regretted
rent	rented
wait	waited
waste	wasted
abide	abided
blend	blended
end	ended
found	founded
fund	funded
grade	graded
plod	plodded

Type II
Present	Past
cast	cast
cut	cut
put	put
set	set
meet	met
bleed	bled
read /riːd/	read /rɛd/
rid	rid
shed	shed
bend	bent
lend	lent
send	sent

Although Modern English has very little affixal morphology, its number includes a marker of the preterite, other than verbs with vowel changes of the find/found sort, and almost all verbs that end in /t d/ take /ɪd/ as the marker of the preterite, as seen in Type I.

Comparing between the verbs of Type I and Type II, those in Type II are all basic vocabulary (This is a claim about Type II verbs and not about basic verbs since there are basic verbs in Type I also). However, no denominative verbs (those formed from nouns like to gut, to braid, to hoard, to bed, to court, to head, to hand) are in Type II. There are no verbs of Latin or French origin; all stems like depict, enact, denote, elude, preclude, convict are Type I. Furthermore, all new forms are inflected as Type I and so all native speakers of English would presumably agree that the preterites of to sned and to absquatulate would most likely be snedded and absquatulated.

That evidence shows that the absence of a "dental preterite" marker on roots ending in apical stops in Type II reflects a more original state of affairs. In the early history of the language, the "dental preterite" marker was in a sense absorbed into the root-final consonant when it was /t/ or /d/, and the affix /ɪd/ after word-final apical stops then belonged to a later stratum in the evolution of the language. The same suffix was involved in both types but with a total reversal of "strategy." Other exercises of internal reconstruction would point to the conclusion that the original affix of the dental preterites was /Vd/ (V being a vowel of uncertain phonetics). A direct inspection of Old English would certainly reveal several different stem-vowels involved. In modern formations, stems that end in /t d/ preserve the vowel of the preterite marker. The loss of the stem vowel had taken place already whenever the root ended in an apical stop before the first written evidence.

=== Latin ===
Latin has many examples of "word families" showing vowel alternations. Some of them are examples of Indo-European ablaut: pendō "weigh", pondus "a weight"; dōnum "gift", datum "a given"; caedō "cut" perf. ce-cīd-; dīcō "speak", participle dictus; that is, inherited from the proto-language (all unmarked vowels in these examples are short), but some, involving only short vowels, clearly arose within Latin: faciō "do", participle factus, but perficiō, perfectus "complete, accomplish"; amīcus "friend" but inimīcus "unfriendly, hostile"; legō "gather", but colligō "bind, tie together", participle collectus; emō "take; buy", but redimō "buy back", participle redemptus; locus "place" but īlicō "on the spot" (< *stloc-/*instloc-); capiō "take, seize", participle captus but percipiō "lay hold of", perceptus; arma "weapon" but inermis "unarmed"; causa "lawsuit, quarrel" but incūsō "accuse, blame"; claudō "shut", inclūdō "shut in"; caedō "fell, cut", but concīdō "cut to pieces"; and damnō "find guilty" but condemnō "sentence" (verb). To simplify, vowels in initial syllables never alternate in this way, but in non-initial syllables short vowels of the simplex forms become -i- before a single consonant and -e- before two consonants; the diphthongs -ae- and -au- of initial syllables alternate respectively with medial -ī- and -ū-.

As happened here, reduction in contrast in a vowel system is very commonly associated with position in atonic (unaccented) syllables, but Latin's tonic accent of reficiō and refectus is on the same syllable as simplex faciō, factus, which is true of almost all of the examples given (cólligō, rédimō, īlicō with initial-syllable accent are the only exceptions) and indeed for most examples of such alternations in the language. The reduction of contrast points in the vowel system (-a- and -o- fall together with -i- before a single consonant, with -e- before two consonants; long vowels replace diphthongs) must not have had anything to do with the location of the accent in attested Latin.

The accentual system of Classical Latin is well-known, partly from statements by Roman grammarians and partly from agreements among the Romance languages on the location of tonic accent: the tonic accent in Latin fell three syllables before the end of any word with three or more syllables unless the second-last syllable (called the penult in classical linguistics) was "heavy" (contained a diphthong or a long vowel or was followed by two or more consonants). Then, that syllable had the tonic accent: perfíciō, perféctus, rédimō, condémnō, inérmis.

If there is any connection between word-accent and vowel-weakening, the accent in question cannot be that of Classical Latin. Since the vowels of initial syllables do not show that weakening (to oversimplify a bit), the obvious inference is that in prehistory, the tonic accent must have been an accent that was always on the first syllable of a word. Such an accentual system is very common in the world's languages (Czech, Latvian, Finnish, Hungarian, and, with certain complications, High German and Old English) but was definitely not the accentual system of Proto-Indo-European.

Therefore, on the basis of internal reconstruction within Latin, a prehistoric sound-law can be discovered that replaced the inherited accentual system with an automatic initial-syllable accent, which itself was replaced by the attested accentual system. Celtic languages also have an automatic word-initial accent that is subject, like the Germanic languages, to a few exceptions; Celtic, Germanic, and Italic languages share some other features as well. While the word-initial accent system may appear to be an areal feature, the opinion remained speculative.

There is a very similar set of givens in English but with very different implications for internal reconstruction. There is pervasive alternation between long and short vowels (the former now phonetically diphthongs): between /aɪ/ and /ɪ/ in words like divide, division; decide, decision; between /oʊ/ and /ɒ/ in words like provoke, provocative; pose, positive; between /aʊ/ and /ʌ/ in words like pronounce, pronunciation; renounce, renunciation; profound, profundity. As in the Latin example, the tonic accent of Modern English is often on the syllable showing the vowel alternation.

In Latin, an explicit hypothesis could be framed on the location of word-accent in prehistoric Latin that would account for both the vowel alternations and the attested system of accent. Indeed, such a hypothesis is hard to avoid. By contrast, the alternations in English point to no specific hypothesis but only a general suspicion that word accent must be the explanation, and that the accent in question must have been different from that of Modern English. Where the accent used to be and what the rules, if any, are for its relocation in Modern English cannot be recovered by internal reconstruction. In fact, even the givens are uncertain: it is not possible to tell even whether tonic syllables were lengthened or atonic syllables were shortened (actually, both were involved).

Part of the problem is that the alternations in English between diphthongs and monophthongs (between Middle English long and short vowels, respectively) originate from at least six different sources; the oldest of these (evidenced, for example, in write, written) dates back to Proto-Indo-European. However, even if it were possible to sort out the corpus of affected words, sound changes after the relocation of tonic accent have eliminated the necessary conditions for framing accurate sound laws. It is actually possible to reconstruct the history of the English vowel system with great accuracy but not by internal reconstruction.

In short, during the atonic shortening, the tonic accent was two syllables after the affected vowel and was later retracted to its current position. However, words like division and vicious (compare vice) have lost a syllable in the first place, which would be an insuperable obstacle to a correct analysis based on internal reconstruction alone.
