= Areal feature =

Linguistic feature arising through language contact rather than common descent

In geolinguistics, areal features are elements shared by languages or dialects in a geographic area, particularly when such features are not descended from a common ancestor or proto-language. An areal feature is contrasted with genetic relationship determined similarity within the same language family. Features may diffuse from one dominant language to neighbouring languages (see "sprachbund").

Genetic relationships are represented in the family tree model of language change, and areal relationships are represented in the wave model.

== Characteristics ==
Resemblances between two or more languages (whether in typology or in vocabulary) have been observed to result from several mechanisms, including lingual genealogical relation (descent from a common ancestor language, not principally related to biological genetics); borrowing between languages; retention of features when a population adopts a new language; and chance coincidence. When little or no direct documentation of ancestor languages is available, determining whether the similarity is genetic or merely areal can be difficult. Edward Sapir notably used evidence of contact and diffusion as a negative tool for genetic reconstruction, treating it as a subject in its own right only at the end of his career (e.g., for the influence of Tibetan on Tocharian).

== Major models ==
William Labov in 2007 reconciled the tree and wave models in a general framework based on differences between children and adults in their language learning ability. Adults do not preserve structural features with sufficient regularity to establish a norm in their community, but children do. Linguistic features are diffused across an area by contacts among adults. Languages branch into dialects and thence into related languages through small changes in the course of children's learning processes which accumulate over generations, and when speech communities do not communicate (frequently) with each other, these cumulative changes diverge. Diffusion of areal features for the most part hinges on low-level phonetic shifts, whereas tree-model transmission includes in addition structural factors such as "grammatical conditioning, word boundaries, and the systemic relations that drive chain shifting".

== Sprachbund ==
In some areas with high linguistic diversity, a number of areal features have spread across a set of languages to form a sprachbund (also known as a linguistic area, convergence area or diffusion area). Some examples are the Balkan sprachbund, Mainland Southeast Asia linguistic area, and the South Asian linguistic area.

== Examples ==
=== Phonetics and phonology ===
- The spread of the guttural R from either German or French to several Northern European languages.
- Development of a three-tone system with no tones in words ending in a stop consonant, followed by a tone split, and many other phonetic similarities in the Mainland Southeast Asia linguistic area.
- Retroflex consonants in the Burushaski, Nuristani, Dravidian, Munda, and Indo-Aryan families of South Asia.
- The occurrence of click consonants in several languages of Southern Africa, including a few Bantu languages
- The lack of fricatives in Australian languages.
- The use of ejective and aspirated consonants in the languages of the Caucasus.
- The prevalence of ejective and lateral fricatives and affricates in the Pacific Northwest of North America.
- The development of a close front rounded vowel in the Bearnese dialect of Occitan and the Souletin dialect of Basque.
- The absence of [w] and presence of [v] in many languages of Central and Eastern Europe.
- The lack of nasal consonants in languages of the Puget Sound and the Olympic Peninsula.
- The absence of [p] but presence of [b] and [f] in many languages of Northern Africa and the Arabian Peninsula.
- The presence of a voicing contrast on fricatives e.g. [s] vs [z] in Europe and Southwestern Asia.
- An isogloss between dialects with and without phonemic /y/ in Europe cutting across the boundary between Romance and Germanic dialect continua.

=== Morphophonology ===
- Vowel alternation patterns in reduplicatives.

=== Syntax ===
- The tendency in much of Europe to use a transitive verb (e.g. "I have") for possession, rather than a possessive dative construction such as mihi est (Latin: 'to me is') which is more likely the original possessive construction in Proto-Indo-European, considering the lack of a common root for "have" verbs.
- The development of a perfect aspect using "have" + past participle in many European languages (Romance, Germanic, etc.). (The Latin habeo and Germanic haben used for this and the previous point are not in fact etymologically related.)
- A perfect aspect using "be" + past participle for intransitive and reflexive verbs (with participle agreement), present in French, Italian, German, older Spanish and Portuguese, and in older stages of English, only surviving in more archaic phrases like "I am become death, destroyer of worlds" and "The kingdom of this world is become".
- Postposed article, avoidance of the infinitive, merging of genitive and dative, and superessive number formation in some languages of the Balkans.
- The spread of a verb-final word order to the Austronesian languages of New Guinea.
- A system of classifiers/measure words in the Mainland Southeast Asia linguistic area.

=== Sociolinguistics ===
- The use of the plural pronoun as a polite word for you in much of Europe (the tu-vous distinction).

== See also ==
- Comparative method
- Language contact
- Linguistic typology
- Linkage (linguistics)
- Mass comparison
- Wave model
- World Atlas of Language Structures
