= Linguistic reconstruction =

Processes of understanding how earlier languages were spoken

Linguistic reconstruction is the practice of establishing the features of an unattested ancestor language of one or more given languages. There are two kinds of reconstruction:

- Internal reconstruction uses irregularities in a single language to make inferences about an earlier stage of that language – that is, it is based on evidence from that language alone.
- Comparative reconstruction, usually referred to just as reconstruction, establishes features of the ancestor of two or more related languages, belonging to the same language family, by means of the comparative method. A language reconstructed in this way is often referred to as a proto-language (the common ancestor of all the languages in a given family).

Texts discussing linguistic reconstruction commonly preface reconstructed forms with an asterisk (*) to distinguish them from attested forms.

An attested word from which a root in the proto-language is reconstructed is a reflex. More generally, a reflex is the known derivative of an earlier form, which may be either attested or reconstructed. A reflex that is predictable from the reconstructed history of the language is a 'regular' reflex. Reflexes of the same source are cognates.

== Methods ==
First, languages that are thought to have arisen from a common proto-language must meet certain criteria in order to be grouped together; this is a process called subgrouping. Since this grouping is based purely on linguistics, manuscripts and other historical documentation should be analyzed to accomplish this step. However, the assumption that the delineations of linguistics always align with those of culture and ethnicity must not be made. One of the criteria is that the grouped languages usually exemplify shared innovation. This means that the languages must show common changes made throughout history. In addition, most grouped languages have shared retention. This is similar to the first criterion, but instead of changes, they are features that have stayed the same in both languages.

Because linguistics, as in other scientific areas, seeks to reflect simplicity, an important principle in the linguistic reconstruction process is to generate the least possible number of phonemes that correspond to available data. This principle is again reflected when choosing the sound quality of phonemes, as the one which results in the fewest changes (with respect to the data) is preferred.

Comparative Reconstruction makes use of two rather general principles: The Majority Principle and the Most Natural Development Principle. The Majority Principle is the observation that if a cognate set displays a certain pattern (such as a repeating letter in specific positions within a word), it is likely that this pattern was retained from its mother language. The Most Natural Development Principle states that some alterations in languages, diachronically speaking, are more common than others. There are four key tendencies:

1. The final vowel in a word may be omitted.
2. Voiceless sounds, often between vowels, become voiced.
3. Phonetic stops become fricatives.
4. Consonants become voiceless at the end of words.

== Sound construction ==
The Majority Principle is applied in identifying the most likely pronunciation of the predicted etymon, the original word from which the cognates originated. The Most Natural Development Principle describes the general directions in which languages appear to change and so one can search for those indicators. For example, from the words cantar (Spanish) and chanter (French), one may argue that because phonetic stops generally become fricatives, the cognate with the stop [k] is older than the cognate with the fricative [ʃ] and so the former is most likely to more closely resemble the original pronunciation.

== See also ==
- Language change – Modification or development of a language
- Sound change – Process of language change that affects pronunciation or sound system structure

== Sources ==
- Anthony Fox, Linguistic Reconstruction: An Introduction to Theory and Method (Oxford University Press, 1995) ISBN 0-19-870001-6.
- George Yule, The Study of Language (7th Ed.) (Cambridge University Press, 2019) ISBN 978-1-108-73070-9.
- Henry M. Hoenigswald, Language Change and Linguistic Reconstruction (University of Chicago Press, 1960) ISBN 0-226-34741-9.
