= Sister language =

Languages derived from a common earlier language

In historical linguistics, sister languages are languages that are descended from a common ancestral language. Every language in a language family that descends from the same language as the others is a sister to them.

A commonly given example is of Urdu and Hindi (the standardized registers of the Hindustani language), which are mutually intelligible with each other. Also, the Romance languages, each of which is a continuation of Vulgar Latin. Italian and French (both Romance languages) have about 89% lexical overlap, meaning 89 percent of words share the same characteristics and root origins. Similarly, Spanish and Portuguese also have about 89% lexical overlap. Spanish and Romanian overlap less, about 67%, because while Spanish and Portuguese have undergone Arabic influence, Romanian has undergone many different influences over the years, particularly from the Slavic languages and Greek. Along with a large amount of shared vocabulary, the Romance languages share numerous features of morphology and syntax because they are all continuations of their common ancestor, Latin.

Another example is the relationship between Modern Scots and English. Scots is considered to be a sister language of English because they are both descended from the common ancestor Old English (via Early Middle English). The phonological development of the two languages is divergent, with different loanwords entering each language from sources such as Norse, Latin, and French. Political and cultural events have largely dictated the decline of broad Scots as a standard variety in the modern period, and Scots is currently confined to largely spoken use and unofficial functions.

== See also ==
- Daughter language
- Language family
- Lexical similarity
