= Tree model =

Theory in linguistics

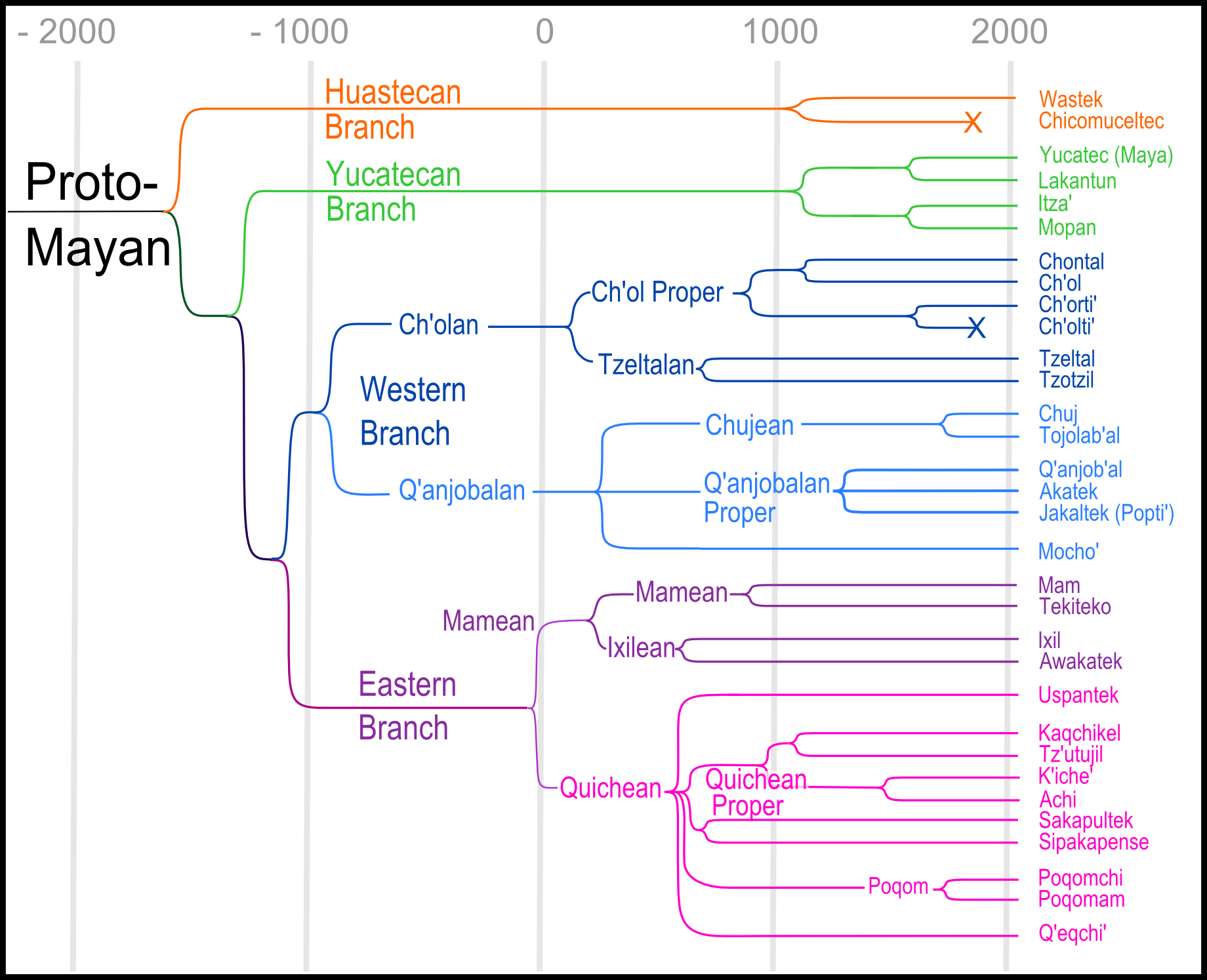
Cladistic representation of the Mayan linguistic family, going back 4000 years. (The numbers represent proposed historical dates in the Common Era).

In historical linguistics, the tree model (also Stammbaum, genetic, or cladistic model) is a model of the evolution of languages analogous to the concept of a family tree, particularly a phylogenetic tree in the biological evolution of species. As with species, each language is assumed to have evolved from a single parent or "mother" language, with languages that share a common ancestor belonging to the same language family.

Popularized by the German linguist August Schleicher in 1853, the tree model has been a common method of describing genetic relationships between languages since the first attempts to do so. It is central to the field of comparative linguistics, which involves using evidence from known languages and observed rules of language feature evolution to identify and describe the hypothetical proto-languages ancestral to each language family, such as Proto-Indo-European and the Indo-European languages. However, this is largely a theoretical, qualitative pursuit, and linguists have always emphasized the inherent limitations of the tree model due to the large role played by horizontal transmission in language evolution, ranging from loanwords to creole languages that have multiple mother languages. The wave model was developed in 1872 by Schleicher's student Johannes Schmidt as an alternative to the tree model that incorporates horizontal transmission.

The tree model also has the same limitations as biological taxonomy with respect to the species problem of quantizing a continuous phenomenon that includes exceptions like ring species in biology and dialect continua in language. The concept of a linkage was developed in response and refers to a group of languages that evolved from a dialect continuum rather than from linguistically isolated child languages of a single language.

== History ==
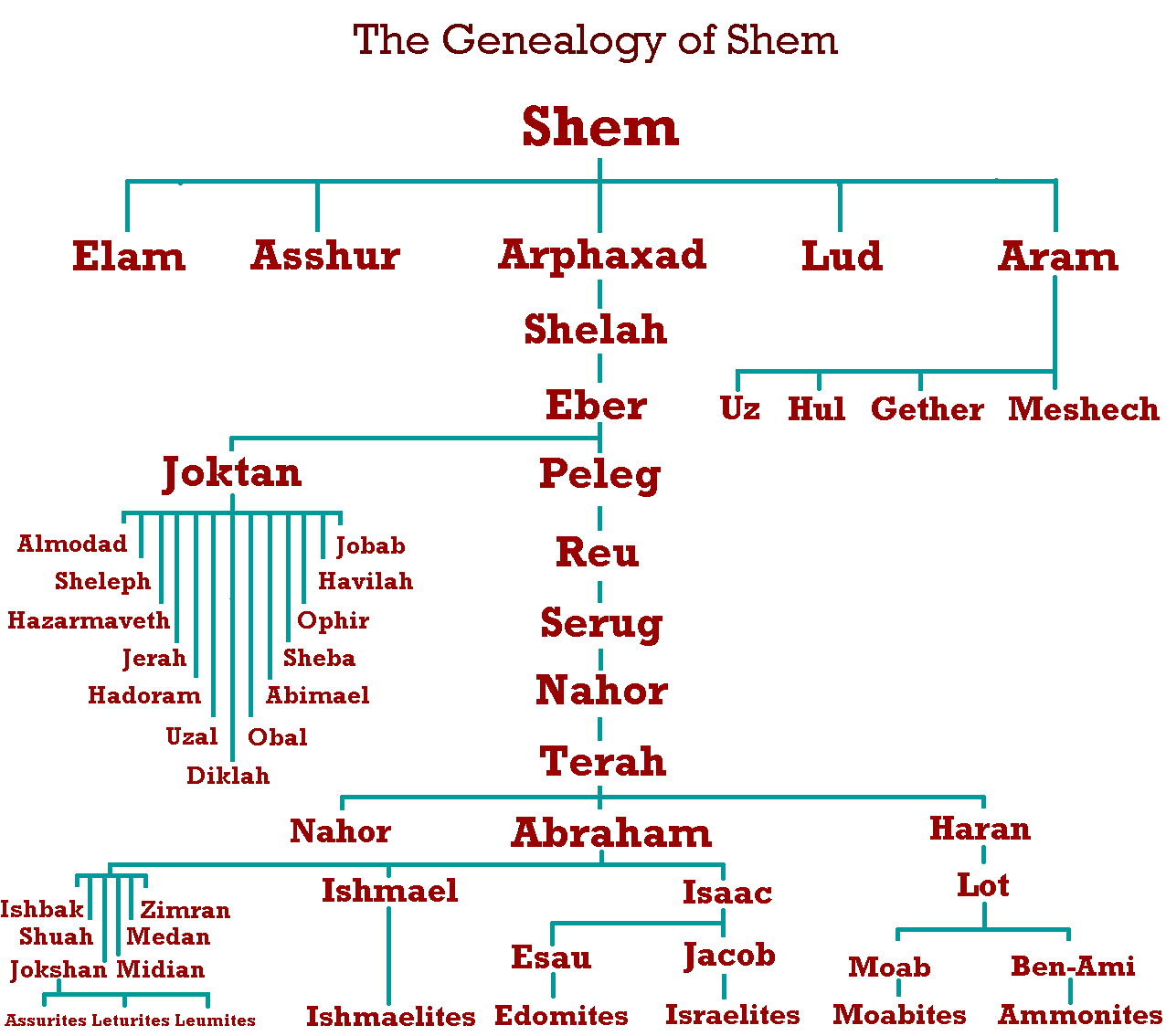
Family tree of Biblical tribes

=== Old Testament and St. Augustine ===
Augustine of Hippo supposed that each of the descendants of Noah founded a nation and that each nation was given its own language: Assyrian for Assur, Hebrew for Heber, and so on. In all he identified 72 nations, tribal founders and languages. The confusion and dispersion occurred in the time of Peleg, son of Heber, son of Shem, son of Noah. Augustine made a hypothesis not unlike those of later historical linguists, that the family of Heber "preserved that language not unreasonably believed to have been the common language of the race ... thenceforth named Hebrew." Most of the 72 languages, however, date to many generations after Heber. St. Augustine solves this first problem by supposing that Heber, who lived 430 years, was still alive when God assigned the 72.

=== Ursprache, the language of paradise ===
St. Augustine's hypothesis stood without major question for over a thousand years. Then, in a series of tracts, published in 1684, expressing skepticism concerning various beliefs, especially Biblical, Sir Thomas Browne wrote:

"Though the earth were widely peopled before the flood ... yet whether, after a large dispersion, and the space of sixteen hundred years, men maintained so uniform a language in all parts, ... may very well be doubted."

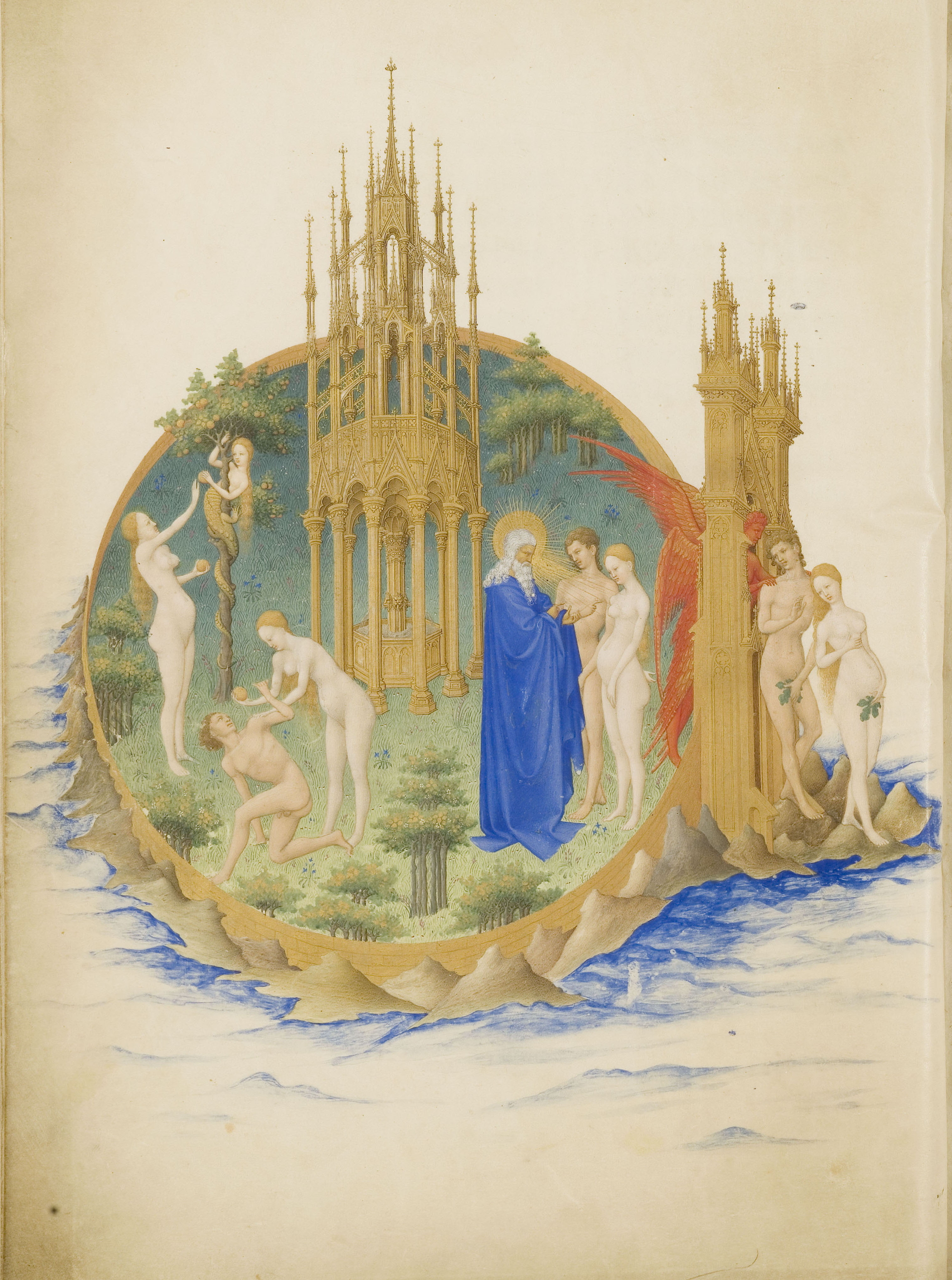
Garden of Eden, home of the Ursprache

By then, discovery of the New World and exploration of the Far East had brought knowledge of numbers of new languages far beyond the 72 calculated by St. Augustine. Citing the Native American languages, Browne suggests the "confusion of tongues at first fell only upon those present in Sinaar at the work of Babel ...." For those "about the foot of the hills, whereabout the ark rested ... their primitive language might in time branch out into several parts of Europe and Asia ...." This is an inkling of a tree. In Browne's view, simplification from a larger aboriginal language than Hebrew could account for the differences in language. He suggests ancient Chinese, from which the others descended by "confusion, admixtion and corruption". Later he invokes "commixture and alteration."

Browne reports a number of reconstructive activities by the scholars of the times:

"The learned Casaubon conceiveth that a dialogue might be composed in Saxon, only of such words as are derivable from the Greek ... Verstegan made no doubt that he could contrive a letter that might be understood by the English, Dutch, and East Frislander ... And if, as the learned Buxhornius contendeth, the Scythian language as the mother tongue runs throughout the nations of Europe, and even as far as Persia, the community on many words, between so many nations, hath more reasonable traduction and were rather derivable from the common tongue diffused through them all, than from any particular nation, which hath also borrowed and holdeth but at second hand."

The confusion at the Tower of Babel was thus removed as an obstacle by setting it aside. Attempts to find similarities in all languages were resulting in the gradual uncovering of an ancient master language from which all the other languages derive. Browne undoubtedly did his writing and thinking well before 1684. In that same revolutionary century in Britain James Howell published Volume II of Epistolae Ho-Elianae, quasi-fictional letters to various important persons in the realm containing valid historical information. In Letter LVIII the metaphor of a tree of languages appears fully developed short of being a professional linguist's view:

"I will now hoist sail for the Netherlands, whose language is the same dialect with the English, and was so from the beginning, being both of them derived from the high Dutch [Howell is wrong here]: The Danish also is but a branch of the same tree ... Now the High Dutch or Teutonick Tongue, is one of the prime and most spacious Maternal Languages of Europe ... it was the language of the Goths and Vandals, and continueth yet of the greatest part of Poland and Hungary, who have a Dialect of hers for their vulgar tongue ... Some of her writers would make this world believe that she was the language spoken in paradise."

The search for "the language of paradise" was on among all the linguists of Europe. Those who wrote in Latin called it the lingua prima, the lingua primaeva or the lingua primigenia. In English it was the Adamic language; in German, the Ursprache or the hebräische Ursprache if one believed it was Hebrew. This mysterious language had the aura of purity and incorruption about it, and those qualities were the standards used to select candidates. This concept of Ursprache came into use well before the neo-grammarians adopted it for their proto-languages. The gap between the widely divergent families of languages remained unclosed.

=== Indo-European model ===
On February 2, 1786, Sir William Jones delivered his Third Anniversary Discourse to the Asiatic Society as its president on the topic of the Hindus. In it he applied the logic of the tree model to three languages, Greek, Latin and Sanskrit, but for the first time in history on purely linguistic grounds, noting "a stronger affinity, both in the roots of the verbs and in the forms of grammar, than could possibly have been produced by accident; ...." He went on to postulate that they sprang from "some common source, which, perhaps, no longer exists." To them he added Gothic, Celtic and Persian as "to the same family."

Jones did not name his "common source" nor develop the idea further, but it was taken up by the linguists of the times. In the (London) Quarterly Review of late 1813–1814, Thomas Young published a review of Johann Christoph Adelung's Mithridates, oder allgemeine Sprachenkunde ("Mithridates, or a General History of Languages"), Volume I of which had come out in 1806, and Volumes II and III, 1809–1812, continued by Johann Severin Vater. Adelung's work described some 500 "languages and dialects" and hypothesized a universal descent from the language of paradise, located in Kashmir central to the total range of the 500. Young begins by pointing out Adelung's indebtedness to Conrad Gesner's Mithridates, de Differentiis Linguarum of 1555 and other subsequent catalogues of languages and alphabets.

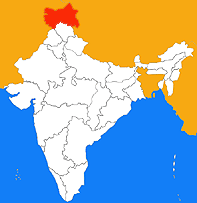
Kashmir (red), Adelung's location of Eden

Young undertakes to present Adelung's classification. The monosyllabic type is most ancient and primitive, spoken in Asia, to the east of Eden, in the direction of Adam's exit from Eden. Then follows Jones' group, still without a name, but attributed to Jones: "Another ancient and extensive class of languages united by a greater number of resemblances than can well be altogether accidental." For this class he offers a name, "Indoeuropean," the first known linguistic use of the word, but not its first known use. The British East India Company was using "Indo-European commerce" to mean the trade of commodities between India and Europe. All the evidence Young cites for the ancestral group are the most similar words: mother, father, etc.

Adelung's additional classes were the Tataric (which would later be known as the disputed family Altaic), the African and the American, which depend on geography and a presumed descent from Eden. Young does not share Adelung's enthusiasm for the language of paradise, and brands it as mainly speculative.

Young's designation, successful in English, was only one of several candidates proposed between 1810 and 1867: indo-germanique (Conrad Malte-Brun, 1810), japetisk (Rasmus Christian Rask, 1815), Indo-Germanisch (Julius Klaproth, 1823), indisch-teutsch (F. Schmitthenner, 1826), sanskritisch (Wilhelm von Humboldt, 1827), indokeltisch (A. F. Pott, 1840), arioeuropeo (Graziadio Isaia Ascoli, 1854), Aryan (Max Müller, 1861) and aryaque (H. Chavée, 1867). These men were all polyglots and prodigies in languages. (Klaproth, for example, the author of the successful German-language candidate, Indo-Germanisch, who criticised Jones for his uncritical method, knew Chinese, Japanese, Tibetan and a number of other languages with their scripts.) The concept of a Biblical Ursprache appealed to their imagination. As hope of finding it gradually died they fell back on the growing concept of common Indo-European spoken by nomadic tribes on the plains of Eurasia, and although they made a good case that this language can be deduced by the methods of comparative linguistics, in fact that is not how they obtained it. It was the one case in which their efforts to find the Ursprache succeeded.

=== Neogrammarian model ===
The model is due in its most strict formulation to the Neogrammarians. The model relies on earlier conceptions of William Jones, Franz Bopp and August Schleicher by adding the exceptionlessness of the sound laws and the regularity of the process. The linguist perhaps most responsible for establishing the link to Darwinism was August Schleicher.

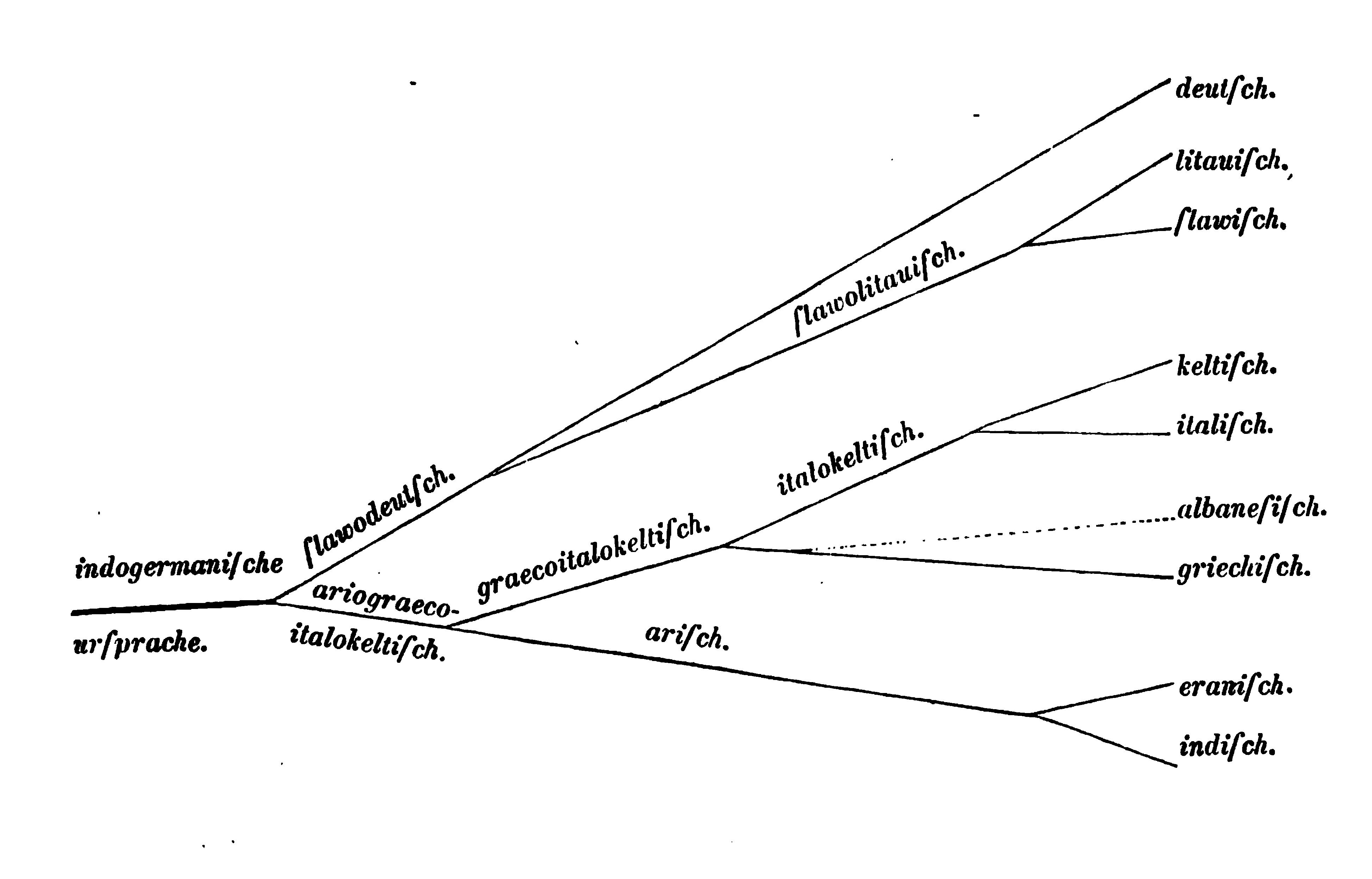
Schleicher's tree model

That he was comparing his Stammbaum, or family tree of languages, to Darwin's presentation of evolution shortly after that presentation, is proved by the open letter he wrote in 1863 to Ernst Haeckel, published posthumously, however. In 1869, Haeckel had suggested he read Origin of Species.

After reading it Schleicher wrote Die Darwinische Theorie und die Sprachwissenschaft, "Darwinism tested by the Science of Language." In a scenario reminiscent of that between Darwin and Wallace over the discovery of evolution (both discovered it independently), Schleicher endorsed Darwin's presentation, but criticised it for not inserting any species. He then presented a Stammbaum of languages, which, however, was not the first he had published.

The evolution of languages was not the source of Darwin's theory of evolution. He had based that on variation of species, such as he had observed in finches in the Galapagos Islands, who had appeared to be modifications of a common ancestor. Selection of domestic species to produce a new variety also played a role in his conclusions. The first edition of Origin of Species in 1859 discusses the language tree as though de novo under the topic of classification. Darwin criticises the synchronic method devised by Linnaeus, suggesting that it be replaced by a "natural arrangement" based on evolution. He says:

"It may be worth while to illustrate this view of classification, by taking the case of languages. If we possessed a perfect pedigree of mankind, a genealogical arrangement of the races of man would afford the best classification of the various languages now spoken throughout the world; and if all extinct languages, and all intermediate and slowly changing dialects, had to be included, such an arrangement would, I think, be the only possible one. Yet it might be that some very ancient language had altered little, and had given rise to few new languages, whilst others (owing to the spreading and subsequent isolation and states of civilisation of the several races, descended from a common race) had altered much, and had given rise to many new languages and dialects. The various degrees of difference in the languages from the same stock, would have to be expressed by groups subordinate to groups; but the proper or even only possible arrangement would still be genealogical; and this would be strictly natural, as it would connect together all languages, extinct and modern, by the closest affinities, and would give the filiation and origin of each tongue."

Schleicher had never heard of Darwin before Haeckel brought him to Schleicher's attention. He had published his own work on the Stammbaum in an article of 1853, six years before the first edition of Origin of Species in 1859. The concept of descent of languages was by no means new. Thomas Jefferson, a devout linguist himself, had proposed that the continual necessity for neologisms implies that languages must "progress" or "advance." These ideas foreshadow evolution of either biological species or languages, but after the contact of Schleicher with Darwin's ideas, and perhaps Darwin's contact with the historical linguists, Evolution and language change were inextricably linked, and would become the basis for classification. Now, as then, the main problems would be to prove specific lines of descent, and to identify the branch points.

=== Phylogenetic tree ===
The old metaphor was given an entirely new meaning under the old name by Joseph Harold Greenberg in a series of essays beginning about 1950. Since the adoption of the family tree metaphor by the linguists, the concept of evolution had been proposed by Charles Darwin and was generally accepted in biology. Taxonomy, the classification of living things, had already been invented by Carl Linnaeus. It used a binomial nomenclature to assign a species name and a genus name to every known living organism. These were arranged in a biological hierarchy under several phyla, or most general groups, branching ultimately to the various species. The basis for this biological classification was the observed shared physical features of the species.

Darwin, however, reviving another ancient metaphor, the tree of life, hypothesized that the groups of the Linnaean classification (today's taxa), descended in a tree structure over time from simplest to most complex. The Linnaean hierarchical tree was synchronic; Darwin envisioned a diachronic process of common descent. Where Linnaeus had conceived ranks, which were consistent with the great chain of being adopted by the rationalists, Darwin conceived lineages. Over the decades after Darwin it became clear that the ranks of Linnaeus' hierarchy did not correspond exactly to the lineages. It became the prime goal of taxonomy to discover the lineages and alter the classification to reflect them, which it did under the overall guidance of the Nomenclature Codes, rule books kept by international organizations to authorize and publish proposals to reclassify species and other taxa. The new approach was called phylogeny, the "generation of phyla," which devised a new tree metaphor, the phylogenetic tree. One unit in the tree and all its offspring units were a clade and the discovery of clades was cladistics.

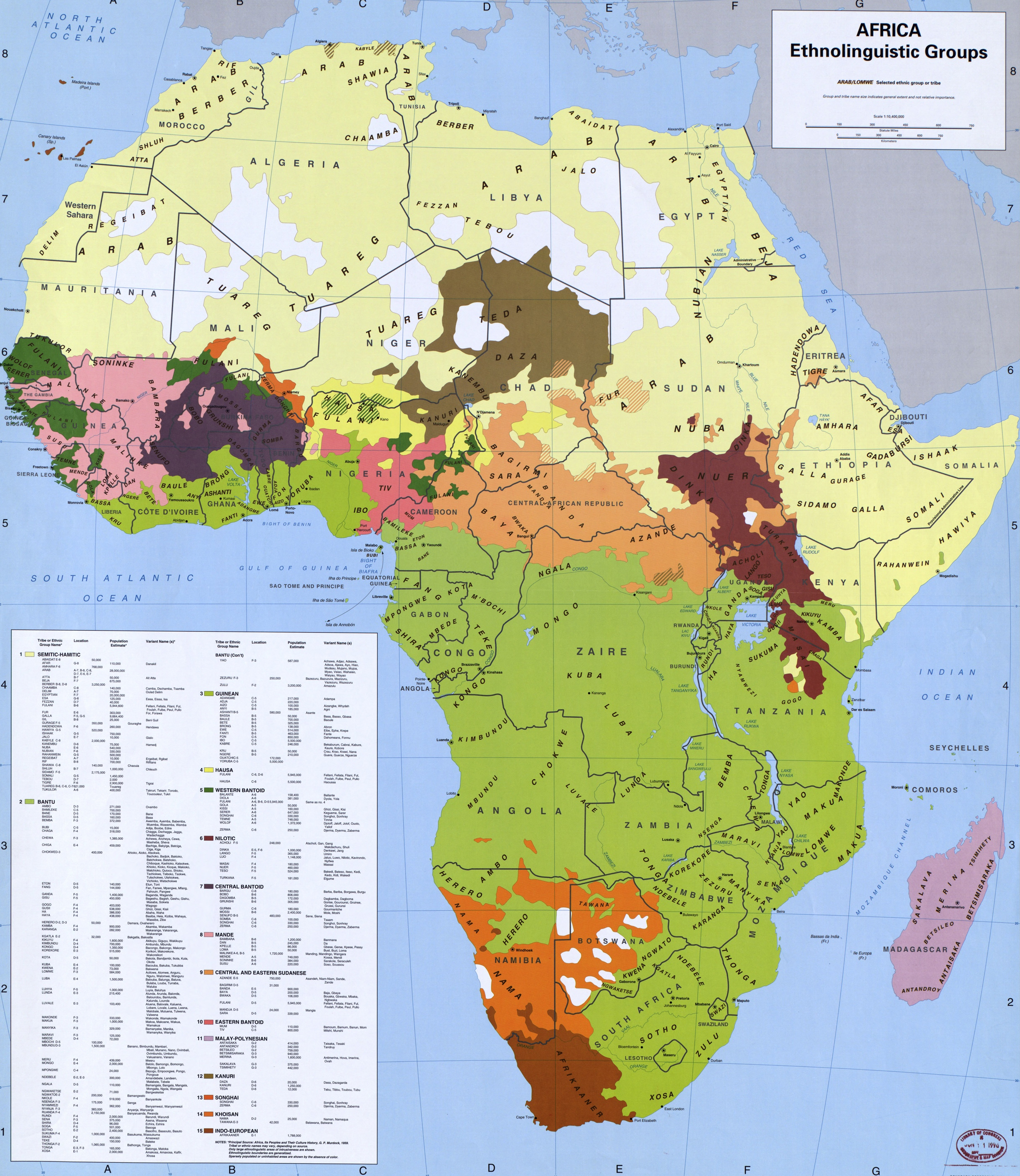
Classification of African language families

Greenberg began writing during a time when phylogenetic systematics lacked the tools available to it later: the computer (computational systematics) and DNA sequencing (molecular systematics). To discover a cladistic relationship researchers relied on as large a number of morphological similarities among species as could be defined and tabulated. Statistically the greater the number of similarities the more likely species were to be in the same clade. This approach appealed to Greenberg, who was interested in discovering linguistic universals. Altering the tree model to make the family tree a phylogenetic tree he said:

"Any language consists of thousands of forms with both sound and meaning ... any sound whatever can express any meaning whatever. Therefore, if two languages agree in a considerable number of such items ... we necessarily draw a conclusion of common historical origin. Such genetic classifications are not arbitrary ... the analogy here to biological classification is extremely close ... just as in biology we classify species in the same genus or high unit because the resemblances are such as to suggest a hypothesis of common descent, so with genetic hypotheses in language."

In this analogy, a language family is like a clade, the languages are like species, the proto-language is like an ancestor taxon, the language tree is like a phylogenetic tree and languages and dialects are like species and varieties. Greenberg formulated large tables of characteristics of hitherto neglected languages of Africa, the Americas, Indonesia and northern Eurasia and typed them according to their similarities. He called this approach "typological classification", arrived at by descriptive linguistics rather than by comparative linguistics.

=== Dates and glottochronology ===
The comparative method has been used by historical linguists to piece together tree models utilizing discrete lexical, morphological, and phonological data. Chronology can be found but there is no absolute date estimates utilizing this system.

Glottochronology enables absolute dates to be estimated. Shared cognates (cognates meaning to have common historical origin) are calculate divergence times. However the method was found to be later discredited due to the data being unreliable. Due to this historical linguists have trouble with exact age estimation when pinpointing the age of the Indo-European language family. It could range from 4000 BP to 40,000 BP, or anywhere in-between those dates according to Dixon sourced from the rise and fall of language, (Cambridge University Press). As seen in the article here.

Possible solutions for Glottochronology are forthcoming due to computational phylogenetic methods. Techniques such as using models of evolution improves accuracy of tree branch length and topology. There for, using computational phylogenetic methods computational methods enable researchers to analyze linguistic data from evolutionary biology. This further assists in testing theories against each other, such as the Kurgan theory and the Anatolian theory, both claiming origins of Info-European languages.

== Computational phylogenetics in historical linguistics ==
The comparative method compares features of various languages to assess how similar one language is to another. The results of such an assessment are data-oriented; that is, the results depend on the number of features and the number of languages compared. Until the arrival of the computer on the historical linguistics landscape, the numbers in both cases were necessarily small. The effect was of trying to depict a photograph using a small number of large pixels, or picture units. The limitations of the Tree Model were all too painfully apparent, resulting in complaints from the major historical linguists.

In the late 20th century, linguists began using software intended for biological classification to classify languages. Programs and methods became increasingly sophisticated. In the early 21st century, the Computational Phylogenetics in Historical Linguistics (CPHL) project, a consortium of historical linguists, received funding from the National Science Foundation to study phylogenies. The Indo-European family is a major topic of study. As of January, 2012, they had collected and coded a "screened" database of "22 phonological characters, 13 morphological characters, and 259 lexical characters," and an unscreened database of more. Wordlists of 24 Indo-European languages are included. Larger numbers of features and languages increase the precision, provided they meet certain criteria. Using specialized computer software, they test various phylogenetic hypotheses for their ability to account for the characters by genetic descent.

=== Limitations of the model ===
One endemic limitation of the tree model is the very founding presumption on which it is based: it requires a classification based on languages or, more generally, on language varieties. Since a variety represents an abstraction from the totality of linguistic features, there is the possibility for information loss during the translation of data (from a map of isoglosses) into a tree. For example, there is the issue of dialect continua. They provide varieties that are not unequivocally one language or another but contain features characteristic of more than one. The issue of how they are to be classified is similar to the issue presented by ring species to the concept of species classification in biology.

The limitations of the tree model, in particular its inability to handle the non-discrete distribution of shared innovations in dialect continua, have been addressed through the development of non-cladistic (non-tree-based) methodologies. They include the Wave model; and more recently, the concept of linkage.

An additional limitation of the tree model involves mixed and hybrid languages, as well as language mixing in general since the tree model allows only for divergences. For example, according to Zuckermann (2009:63), "Israeli", his term for Modern Hebrew, which he regards as a Semito-European hybrid, "demonstrates that the reality of linguistic genesis is far more complex than a simple family tree system allows. 'Revived' languages are unlikely to have a single parent."

=== Perfect phylogenies ===
The purpose of phylogenetic software is to generate cladograms, a special kind of tree in which the links only bifurcate; that is, at any node in the same direction only two branches are offered. The input data is a set of characters that can be assigned states in different languages, such as present (1) or absent (0). A language therefore can be described by a unique coordinate set consisting of the state values for all of the characters considered. These coordinates can be like each other or less so. Languages that share the most states are most like each other.

The software massages all the states of all the characters of all the languages by one of several mathematical methods to accomplish a pairwise comparison of each language with all the rest. It then constructs a cladogram based on degrees of similarity; for example, hypothetical languages, a and b, which are closest only to each other, are assumed to have a common ancestor, a-b. The next closest language, c, is assumed to have a common ancestor with a-b, and so on. The result is a projected series of historical paths leading from the overall common ancestor (the root) to the languages (the leaves). Each path is unique. There are no links between paths. Every leaf and node have one and only one ancestor. All the states are accounted for by descent from other states. A cladogram that conforms to these requirements is a perfect phylogeny.

At first there seemed to be little consistency of results in trials varying the factors presumed to be relevant. A new cladogram resulted from any change, which suggested that the method was not capturing the underlying evolution of languages but only reflecting the extemporaneous judgements of the researchers. In order to find the factors that did bear on phylogeny the researchers needed to have some measure of the accuracy of their results; i.e., the results needed to be calibrated against known phylogenies. They ran the experiment using different assumptions looking for the ones that would produce the closest matches to the most secure Indo-European phylogenies. Those assumptions could be used on problem areas of the Indo-European phylogeny with greater confidence.

To obtain a reasonably valid phylogeny, the researchers found they needed to enter as input all three types of characters: phonological, lexical and morphological, which were all required to present a picture that was sufficiently detailed for calculation of phylogeny. Only qualitative characters produced meaningful results. Repeated states were too ambiguous to be correctly interpreted by the software; therefore characters that were subject to back formation and parallel development, which reverted a character to a prior state or adopted a state that evolved in another character, respectively, were screened from the input dataset.

=== Perfect phylogenetic networks ===
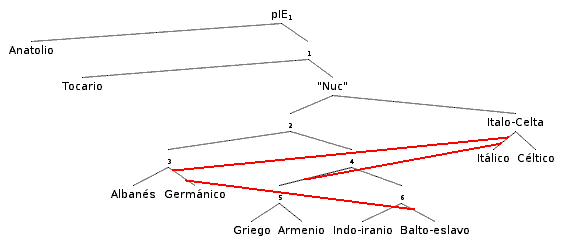
A phylogenetic network, one of many posited by the CPHL. The phylogenetic tree appear in black lines. The contact edges are the red lines. Here there are three, the most parsimonious number required to generate a feasible network for Indo-European.

Despite their care to code the best qualitative characters in sufficient numbers, the researchers could obtain no perfect phylogenies for some groups, such as Germanic and Albanian within Indo-European. They reasoned that a significant number of characters, which could not be explained by genetic descent from the group's calculated ancestor, were borrowed. Presumably, if the wave model, which explained borrowing, were a complete explanation of the group's characters, no phylogeny at all could be found for it. If both models were partially effective, then a tree would exist, but it would need to be supplemented by non-genetic explanations. The researchers therefore modified the software and method to include the possibility of borrowing.

The researchers introduced into the experiment the concept of the interface, or allowed boundary over which character states would flow. A one-way interface, or edge, existed between a parent and a child. If only one-way edges were sufficient to explain the presence of all the states in a language, then there was no need to look beyond the perfect phylogeny. If not, then one or more contact edges, or bidirectional interfaces, could be added to the phylogeny. A language therefore might have more than one source of states: the parent or a contact language.

A tree so modified was no longer a tree as such: there could be more than one path from root to leaf. The researchers called this arrangement a network. The states of a character still evolved along a unique path from root to leaf, but its origin could be either the root under consideration or a contact language. If all the states of the experiment could be accounted for by the network, it was termed a perfect phylogenetic network.

=== Compatibility and feasibility ===
The generation of networks required two phases. In the first phase, the researchers devised a number of phylogenies, called candidate trees, to be tested for compatibility. A character is compatible when its origin is explained by the phylogeny generated. In a perfect phylogeny, all the characters are compatible and the compatibility of the tree is 100%. By the principle of parsimony, or Occam's razor, no networks are warranted. Candidate trees were obtained by first running the phylogeny-generation software using the Indo-European dataset (the strings of character states) as input, then modifying the resultant tree into other hypotheses to be tested.

None of the original candidate trees were perfect phylogenies, although some of the subtrees within them were. The next phase was to generate networks from the trees of highest compatibility scores by adding interfaces one at a time, selecting the interface of highest compatibility, until sufficiency was obtained; that is, the compatibility of the network was highest. As it turned out, the number of compatible networks generated might vary from none to over a dozen. However, not all the possible interfaces were historically feasible. Interfaces between some languages were geographically and chronologically not very likely. Inspecting the results, the researchers excluded the non-feasible interfaces until a list of only feasible networks remained, which could be arranged in order of compatibility score.

=== Most feasible network for Indo-European ===
The researchers began with five candidate trees for Indo-European, lettered A-E, one generated from the phylogenetic software, two modifications of it and two suggested by Craig Melchert, a historical linguist and Indo-Europeanist. The trees differed mainly in the placement of the most ambiguous group, the Germanic languages, and Albanian, which did not have enough distinctive characters to place it exactly. Tree A contained 14 incompatible characters; B, 19; C, 17; D, 21; E,18. Trees A and C had the best compatibility scores. The incompatibilities were all lexical, and A's were a subset of C's.

Subsequent generation of networks found that all incompatibilities could be resolved with a minimum of three contact edges except for Tree E. As it did not have a high compatibility, it was excluded. Tree A had 16 possible networks, which a feasibility inspection reduced to three. Tree C had one network, but as it required an interface to Baltic and not Slavic, it was not feasible.

Tree A, the most compatible and feasible tree, hypothesizes seven groups separating from Proto-Indo-European between about 4000 BC and 2250 BC, as follows.

- The first to separate was Anatolian, about 4000 BC.
- Tocharian followed at about 3500 BC.
- Shortly thereafter, about 3250, Proto-Italo-Celtic (western Indo-European) separated, becoming Proto-Italic and Proto-Celtic at about 2500 BC.
- At about 3000, Proto-Albano-Germanic separated, becoming Albanian and Proto-Germanic at about 2000.
- At about 3000 Proto-Greco-Armenian (southern Indo-European) divided, becoming Proto-Greek and Proto-Armenian at about 1800.
- Balto-Slavic appeared about 2500, dividing into Proto-Baltic and Proto-Slavic at about 1000.
- Finally, Proto-Indo-European became Proto-Indo-Iranian (eastern Indo-European) at about 2250.

Trees B and E offer the alternative of Proto-Germano-Balto-Slavic (northern Indo-European), making Albanian an independent branch. The only date for which authors vouch is the last, based on the continuity of the Yamna culture, the Andronovo Culture and known Indo-Aryan speaking cultures. All others are described as "dead reckoning."

Given the phylogeny of best compatibility, A, three contact edges are required to complete the compatibility. This is group of edges with the fewest borrowing events:

- First, an edge between Proto-Italic and Proto-Germanic, which must have begun after 2000, according to the dating scheme given.
- A second contact edge was between Proto-Italic and Proto-Greco-Armenian, which must have begun after 2500.
- The third contact edge is between Proto-Germanic and Proto-Baltic, which must have begun after 1000.

Tree A with the edges described above is described by the authors as "our best PPN." In all PPNs, it is clear that although the initial daughter languages became distinct in relative isolation, the later evolution of the groups can be explained only by evolution in proximity to other languages with which an exchange takes place by the wave model.

== See also ==
- Comparative method
- Evolutionary linguistics
- Genetic relationship (linguistics)
- Indo-European studies
- Language family
- Linkage (linguistics)
- Wave model (linguistics)
- Father Tongue hypothesis

== Bibliography ==
- Bloomfield, Leonard (1984) [1933]. Language. Chicago and London: University of Chicago Press.
- Browne, Thomas (1852) [1684], "Miscellany Tracts; Miscellanies; Tract 8, Of Languages, and Particularly of the Saxon Tongue", in Tenison, Thomas (ed.), The Works of Sir Thomas Browne, Bohn's Antiquarian Library, vol. III, Lincoln's Inn Fields: Cox (Brothers) and Wyman, pp. 223–241.
- François, Alexandre (2014), "Trees, Waves and Linkages: Models of Language Diversification" (PDF), in Bowern, Claire; Evans, Bethwyn (eds.), The Routledge Handbook of Historical Linguistics, London: Routledge, pp. 161–189, ISBN 978-0-41552-789-7.
- Heggarty, Paul; Maguire, Warren; McMahon, April (2010). "Splits or waves? Trees or webs? How divergence measures and network analysis can unravel language histories". Philosophical Transactions of the Royal Society B. 365 (1559): 3829–3843. doi:10.1098/rstb.2010.0099. PMC 2981917. PMID 21041208.
- Kalyan, Siva; François, Alexandre (2018), "Freeing the Comparative Method from the tree model: A framework for Historical Glottometry" (PDF), in Kikusawa, Ritsuko; Reid, Laurie (eds.), Let's Talk about Trees: Genetic relationships of languages and their phylogenic representation, Senri Ethnological Studies, 98, Ōsaka: National Museum of Ethnology, pp. 59–89.
- Nakhleh, Luay; Ringe, Don; Warnow, Tandy (2005). "Perfect Phylogenetic Networks: A New Methodology for Reconstructing the Evolutionary History of Natural Languages" (PDF). Language. 81 (2): 382–420. CiteSeerX 10.1.1.65.1791. doi:10.1353/lan.2005.0078. S2CID 162958.
- Young, Thomas (October 1813). "Adlung's General History of Languages". The Quarterly Review. X (XIX Article XII). London: John Murray: 250–292.
