= Johannes Schmidt (linguist) =

German linguist (1843–1901)

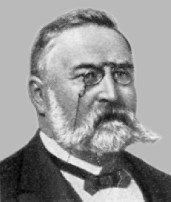
- Born: Johannes Friedrich Heinrich Schmidt; 29 July 1843; Prenzlau, Province of Brandenburg, Prussia
- Died: 4 July 1901 (aged 57); Berlin, Province of Brandenburg, Prussia, German Empire
- Known for: Wave model; Asno law

Johannes Friedrich Heinrich Schmidt (29 July 1843 – 4 July 1901) was a German linguist. He developed the Wellentheorie ('wave theory') of language development.

== Biography ==
Schmidt was born in Prenzlau, Province of Brandenburg. He was educated at Bonn and at Jena where he studied philology (historical linguistics) with August Schleicher and specialized in Indo-European, especially Slavic, languages. He earned a doctorate in 1865 and worked from 1866 as a teacher at a gymnasium in Berlin.

In 1868 Schmidt was invited by the University of Bonn to accept a professorship of German and Slavic languages. In Bonn he published the work Die Verwandtschaftsverhältnisse der indogermanischen Sprachen ('The Relationships of the Indo-Germanic Languages', 1872), which presented his Wellentheorie ('wave theory'). According to this theory, new features of a language spread from a central area in continuously weakening concentric circles, similar to the waves created when a stone is thrown into a body of water. This should result in convergence among dissimilar languages. The theory was directed against the doctrine of sound laws introduced by the Neogrammarians in 1870, and contrasted with Schleicher's phylogenetic model.

From 1873 to 1876 Schmidt was a professor of philology at the University of Graz in Austria. In 1876 he returned to Berlin, where he worked as a professor at Humboldt University. He died in Berlin at the age of fifty-seven.

== Bibliography ==
- Zur Geschichte des indogermanischen Vocalismus (Part I). Weimar, H. Böhlau (1871)
- Die Verwandtschaftsverhältnisse der indogermanischen Sprachen. Weimar, H. Böhlau (1872)
- Zur Geschichte des indogermanischen Vocalismus (Part II). Weimar, H. Böhlau (1875)
- Die Pluralbildungen der indogermanischen Neutra. Weimar, H. Böhlau (1889)
- Die Urheimat der Indogermanen und das europäische Zahlsystem, (1890)
- Kritik der Sonantentheorie. Eine sprachwissenschaftliche Untersuchung. Weimar, H. Böhlau (1895)

He was joint editor with Ernst Kuhn of the Zeitschrift für vergleichende Sprachforschung (Journal for Comparative Language Research) from 1875 until 1901.
