= Language family =

Group of languages related through a common ancestor

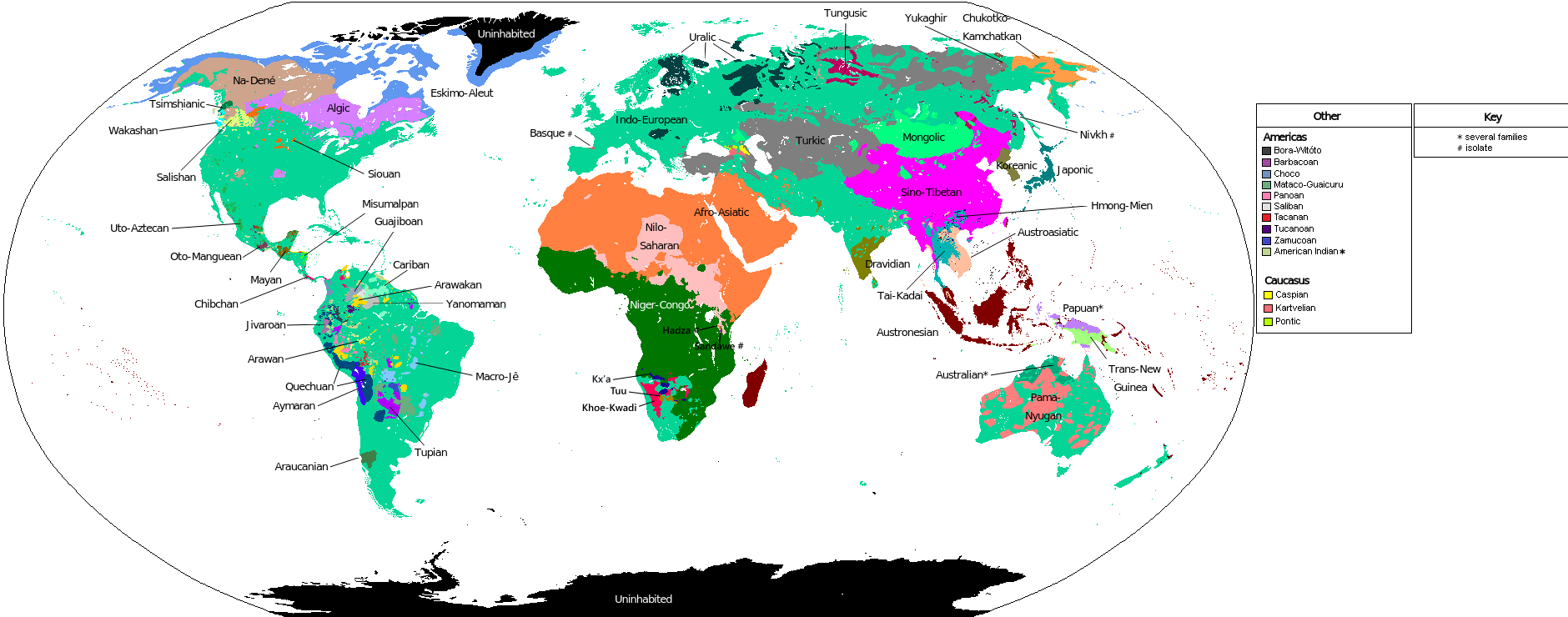
Map of the main language families of the world

A language family is a group of languages related through descent from a common ancestor, called the proto-language of that family. The term family is a metaphor borrowed from biology, with the tree model used in historical linguistics analogous to a family tree, or to phylogenetic trees of taxa used in evolutionary taxonomy. Linguists thus describe the daughter languages within a language family as being genetically related. The divergence of a proto-language into daughter languages typically occurs through geographical separation, with different regional dialects of the proto-language undergoing different language changes and thus becoming distinct languages over time.

One well-known example of a language family is the Romance languages, including Spanish, French, Italian, Portuguese, Romanian, Catalan, Romansh, and many others, all of which are descended from Vulgar Latin. (Note: Vernacular Latin, as opposed to the Classical Latin used as a literary language.) The Romance family itself is part of the larger Indo-European family, which includes many other languages native to Europe and South Asia, all believed to be descended from a common ancestor known as Proto-Indo-European. The Indo-European family is the largest language family in terms of number of living speakers, and the best-studied.

A language family is usually said to contain at least two languages, although language isolates — languages that are not related to any other language — are occasionally referred to as families that contain one language. Conversely, there is no upper bound to the number of languages a family can contain. Some families, such as the Austronesian languages, contain over 1,000.

Language families can be identified from characteristics shared amongst their languages. Sound changes are one of the strongest pieces of evidence that can be used to identify a genetic relationship because of their predictable and consistent nature, and through the comparative method can be used to reconstruct proto-languages. However, languages can also change through language contact, which can falsely suggest genetic relationships. For example, the Mongolic, Tungusic, and Turkic languages share many similarities that have led several scholars to believe they were related. These supposed relationships were later discovered (in the view of most scholars) to be derived through language contact and thus they are not related through shared ancestry. Eventually though, intense language contact with other language families, and inconsistent changes within the original language family, will obscure inherited characteristics and make it virtually impossible to deduce earlier relationships; even the oldest demonstrable language family, Afroasiatic, is far younger than language itself.

== Major language families ==
Map of the contemporary distribution of the Indo-European language family in Eurasia, colored according to its major branches

Estimates of the number of language families in the world may vary widely. According to Ethnologue there are 7,151 living human languages across 142 different language families. Lyle Campbell (2019) identifies a total of 406 independent language families, including isolates.

Ethnologue 27 (2024) lists the following families that contain at least 1% of the 7,164 known languages in the world; while Glottolog 5.3 (2026) lists the following as the largest families, of 7,788 languages (other than sign languages, pidgins, and unclassifiable languages):

Ethnologue 27
Family	No. of languages
Niger–Congo	1,552
Austronesian	1,256
Trans–New Guinea	481
Sino-Tibetan	458
Indo-European	454
Australian	384
Afroasiatic	382
Nilo-Saharan	210
Otomanguean	179
Austroasiatic	167
Kra-Dai	91
Dravidian	85

Glottolog 5.3
Family	No. of languages
Atlantic–Congo	1,408
Austronesian	1,276
Indo-European	586
Sino-Tibetan	519
Afroasiatic	381
Trans–New Guinea	317
Pama–Nyungan	250
Otomanguean	181
Austroasiatic	158
Tai–Kadai	95
Dravidian	82
Arawakan	77

Language counts can vary significantly depending on what is considered merely a dialect; for example Lyle Campbell counts only 27 Otomanguean languages, although he, Ethnologue and Glottolog also disagree as to which languages belong in the family.

Neither Ethnologue nor Glottolog list the language families of sign languages. Of sign language families, the Francosign family, hosting around 70 languages, is by far the largest and most widespread.

The largest five language families in terms of number of speakers (Indo-European, Sino-Tibetan, Afro-Asiatic, Niger-Congo and Austronesian) make up five-sixths (almost 83.3%) of the world’s population.

== Genetic relationship ==
Two languages have a genetic relationship, and belong to the same language family, if both are descended from a common ancestor through the process of language change, or one is descended from the other. The term and the process of language evolution are independent of, and not reliant on, the terminology, understanding, and theories related to genetics in the biological sense, so, to avoid confusion, some linguists prefer the term genealogical relationship.

There is a remarkably similar pattern shown by the linguistic tree and the genetic tree of human ancestry that was verified statistically. Languages interpreted in terms of the putative phylogenetic tree of human languages are transmitted to a great extent vertically (by ancestry) as opposed to horizontally (by spatial diffusion).

=== Establishment ===
In some cases, the shared derivation of a group of related languages from a common ancestor is directly attested in the historical record. For example, this is the case for the Romance language family, wherein Spanish, Italian, Portuguese, Romanian, and French are all descended from Latin, as well as for the North Germanic language family, including Danish, Swedish, Norwegian and Icelandic, which have shared descent from Ancient Norse. Latin and ancient Norse are both attested in written records, as are many intermediate stages between those ancestral languages and their modern descendants.

In other cases, genetic relationships between languages are not directly attested. For instance, the Romance languages and the North Germanic languages are also related to each other, being subfamilies of the Indo-European language family, since both Latin and Old Norse are believed to be descended from an even more ancient language, Proto-Indo-European; however, no direct evidence of Proto-Indo-European or its divergence into its descendant languages survives. In cases such as these, genetic relationships are established through use of the comparative method of linguistic analysis.

In order to test the hypothesis that two languages are related, the comparative method begins with the collection of pairs of words that are hypothesized to be cognates: i.e., words in related languages that are derived from the same word in the shared ancestral language. Pairs of words that have similar pronunciations and meanings in the two languages are often good candidates for hypothetical cognates. The researcher must rule out the possibility that the two words are similar merely due to chance, or due to one having borrowed the words from the other (or from a language related to the other). Chance resemblance is ruled out by the existence of large collections of pairs of words between the two languages showing similar patterns of phonetic similarity. Once coincidental similarity and borrowing have been eliminated as possible explanations for similarities in sound and meaning of words, the remaining explanation is common origin: it is inferred that the similarities occurred due to descent from a common ancestor, and the words are actually cognates, implying the languages must be related.

==== Linguistic interference and borrowing ====
When languages are in contact with one another, either of them may influence the other through linguistic interference such as borrowing. For example, French has influenced English, Arabic has influenced Persian, Persian in turn has influenced Urdu, German has influenced Hungarian, Tamil has influenced Sanskrit, and Chinese has influenced Japanese in this way. However, such influence does not constitute (and is not a measure of) a genetic relationship between the languages concerned. Linguistic interference can occur between languages that are genetically closely related, between languages that are distantly related (like English and French, which are distantly related Indo-European languages) and between languages that have no genetic relationship.

=== Complications ===
Some exceptions to the simple genetic relationship model of languages include language isolates and mixed, pidgin and creole languages.

Mixed languages, pidgins and creole languages constitute special genetic types of languages. They do not descend linearly or directly from a single language and have no single ancestor.

Isolates are languages that cannot be proven to be genealogically related to any other modern language. As a corollary, every language isolate also forms its own language family—a genetic family which happens to consist of just one language. One often cited example is Basque, which forms a language family on its own; but there are many other examples outside Europe. On the global scale, the site Glottolog counts a total of 423 language families in the world, including 184 isolates.

=== Monogenesis ===
One controversial theory concerning the genetic relationships among languages is monogenesis, the idea that all known languages, with the exceptions of creoles, pidgins and sign languages, are descendant from a single ancestral language. If that is true, it would mean all languages (other than pidgins, creoles, and sign languages) are genetically related, but in many cases, the relationships may be too remote to be detectable. Alternative explanations for some basic observed commonalities between languages include developmental theories, related to the biological development of the capacity for language as the child grows from newborn.

== Structure of a family ==
A language family is a monophyletic unit; all its members derive from a common ancestor, and all descendants of that ancestor are included in the family. Thus, the term family is analogous to the biological term clade. Language families can be divided into smaller phylogenetic units, sometimes referred to as "branches" or "subfamilies" of the family; for instance, the Germanic languages are a subfamily of the Indo-European family. Subfamilies share a more recent common ancestor than the common ancestor of the larger family; Proto-Germanic, the common ancestor of the Germanic subfamily, was itself a descendant of Proto-Indo-European, the common ancestor of the Indo-European family. Within a large family, subfamilies can be identified through "shared innovations": members of a subfamily will share features that represent retentions from their more recent common ancestor, but were not present in the overall proto-language of the larger family.

Some taxonomists restrict the term family to a certain level, but there is little consensus on how to do so. Those who affix such labels also subdivide branches into groups, and groups into complexes. A top-level (i.e., the largest) family is often called a phylum or stock. The closer the branches are to each other, the more closely the languages will be related. This means if a branch of a proto-language is four branches down and there is also a sister language to that fourth branch, then the two sister languages are more closely related to each other than to that common ancestral proto-language.

The term macrofamily or superfamily is sometimes applied to proposed groupings of language families whose status as phylogenetic units is generally considered to be unsubstantiated by accepted historical linguistic methods.

=== Dialect continua ===
Some close-knit language families, and many branches within larger families, take the form of dialect continua in which there are no clear-cut geographical boundaries that make it possible to unequivocally identify, define, or count individual languages within the family. However, when the differences between the speech of different regions at the extremes of the continuum are so great that there is no mutual intelligibility between them, as occurs in Arabic, the continuum cannot meaningfully be seen as a single language.

Further, a speech variety may either be considered as a language or as a dialect, depending on social or political considerations. Thus, different sources, especially over time, can give wildly different numbers of languages within a certain family. Classifications of the Japonic family, for example, range from one language (a language isolate with dialects) to nearly twenty—until the classification of Ryukyuan as separate languages within a Japonic language family rather than dialects of Japanese, the Japanese language itself was considered a language isolate and therefore the only language in its family.

=== Isolates ===
Most of the world's languages are known to be related to others. Those that have no known relatives (or for which family relationships are only tentatively proposed) are called language isolates, essentially language families consisting of a single language. There are an estimated 129 language isolates known today. An example is Basque. In general, it is assumed that language isolates have relatives or had relatives at some point in their history but at a time depth too great for linguistic comparison to recover them.

A language isolate is classified based on the fact that enough is known about the isolate to compare it genetically to other languages but no common ancestry or relationship is found with any other known language.

A language isolated in its own branch within a family, such as Albanian and Armenian within Indo-European, is often also called an isolate, but the meaning of the word "isolate" in such cases is usually clarified with a modifier. For instance, Albanian and Armenian may be referred to as an "Indo-European isolate". By contrast, so far as is known, the Basque language is an absolute isolate: it has not been shown to be related to any other modern language despite numerous attempts. A language may be said to be an isolate currently but not historically if related but now extinct relatives are attested. The Aquitanian language, spoken in Roman times, may have been an ancestor of Basque, but it could also have been a sister language to the ancestor of Basque. In the latter case, Basque and Aquitanian would form a small family together. Ancestors are not considered to be distinct members of a family.

=== Proto-languages ===
A proto-language can be thought of as a mother language (not to be confused with a mother tongue) being the root from which all languages in the family stem. The common ancestor of a language family is seldom known directly since most languages have a relatively short recorded history. However, it is possible to recover many features of a proto-language by applying the comparative method, a reconstructive procedure worked out by 19th-century linguist August Schleicher. This can demonstrate the validity of many of the proposed families in the list of language families. For example, the reconstructible common ancestor of the Indo-European language family is called Proto-Indo-European. Proto-Indo-European is not attested by written records and so is conjectured to have been spoken before the invention of writing.

== Visual representation ==
An example of a language tree, containing the Mayan languages

A common visual representation of a language family is given by a genetic language tree. The tree model is sometimes termed a dendrogram or phylogeny. The family tree shows the relationship of the languages within a family, much as a family tree of an individual shows their relationship with their relatives. There are criticisms to the family tree model. Critics focus mainly on the claim that the internal structure of the trees is subject to variation based on the criteria of classification. Even among those who support the family tree model, there are debates over which languages should be included in a language family. For example, within the dubious Altaic language family, there are debates over whether the Japonic and Koreanic languages should be included or not.

The wave model has been proposed as an alternative to the tree model. The wave model uses isoglosses to group language varieties; unlike in the tree model, these groups can overlap. While the tree model implies a lack of contact between languages after derivation from an ancestral form, the wave model emphasizes the relationship between languages that remain in contact, which is more realistic. Historical glottometry is an application of the wave model, meant to identify and evaluate genetic relations in linguistic linkages.

== Other classifications of languages ==
=== Sprachbund ===
A sprachbund is a geographic area having several languages that feature common linguistic structures. The similarities between those languages are caused by language contact, not by chance or common origin, and are not recognized as criteria that define a language family. An example of a sprachbund would be the Indian subcontinent.

Shared innovations, acquired by borrowing or other means, are not considered genetic and have no bearing with the language family concept. It has been asserted, for example, that many of the more striking features shared by Italic languages (Latin, Oscan, Umbrian, etc.) might well be "areal features". However, very similar-looking alterations in the systems of long vowels in the West Germanic languages greatly postdate any possible notion of a proto-language innovation (and cannot readily be regarded as "areal", either, since English and continental West Germanic were not a linguistic area). In a similar vein, there are many similar unique innovations in Germanic, Baltic and Slavic that are far more likely to be areal features than traceable to a common proto-language. But legitimate uncertainty about whether shared innovations are areal features, coincidence, or inheritance from a common ancestor, leads to disagreement over the proper subdivisions of any large language family.

=== Contact languages ===
The concept of language families is based on the historical observation that languages develop dialects, which over time may diverge into distinct languages. However, linguistic ancestry is less clear-cut than familiar biological ancestry, in which species do not crossbreed. It is more like the evolution of microbes, with extensive lateral gene transfer. Quite distantly related languages may affect each other through language contact, which in extreme cases may lead to languages with no single ancestor, whether they be creoles or mixed languages. In addition, a number of sign languages have developed in isolation and appear to have no relatives at all. Nonetheless, such cases are relatively rare and most well-attested languages can be unambiguously classified as belonging to one language family or another, even if this family's relation to other families is not known.

Language contact can lead to the development of new languages from the mixture of two or more languages for the purposes of interactions between two groups who speak different languages. Languages that arise in order for two groups to communicate with each other to engage in commercial trade or that appeared as a result of colonialism are called pidgin. Pidgins are an example of linguistic and cultural expansion caused by language contact. However, language contact can also lead to cultural divisions. In some cases, two different language speaking groups can feel territorial towards their language and do not want any changes to be made to it. This causes language boundaries and groups in contact are not willing to make any compromises to accommodate the other language.

== See also ==
- Comparative linguistics
- Constructed language
- Endangered language
- Extinct language
- Language death
- Language isolate
- List of revived languages
- Global language system
- ISO 639-5
- Linguist List
- List of language families
- List of languages by number of native speakers
- Origin of language
- Proto-language
- Proto-Human language
- Sprachbund
- Tree model
- Unclassified language
- Father Tongue hypothesis
- Farming/language dispersal hypothesis
