= Dialectometry =

Quantitative study of dialects

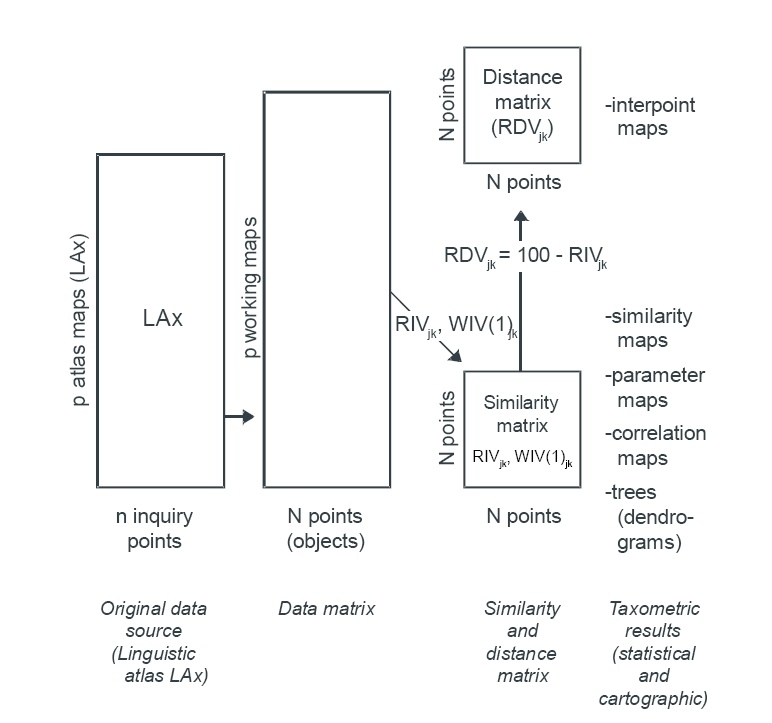
Flow chart of the dialectometrical methods used by the Salzburg school of dialectometry

Dialectometry is the quantitative and computational branch of dialectology, the study of dialect. This sub-field of linguistics studies language variation using the methods of statistics; it arose in the 1970s and 80s as a result of seminal work by J. Séguy and Hans Goebl.

The research concentrates mainly on the regional distribution of dialect similarities, such as cores of dialect and overlapping zones, which can be labelled according to a more or less slight variance of dialect between bordering locations. However, analysis of dialect relationships cannot always be clearly depicted by cladistics, since there are often dialect continuum cases and also examples with elements of convergence, as well as division.

Language atlases serve as an empirical database which document the dialect profile of a large number of locations in detail. Different well-known numerical classification methodologies are used to abstract and visualise a basic pattern from the immense amount of data found in the language atlases.

Not one solid classification can be expected to result from the calculations; rather, different aspects of the basic pattern being searched for can be discovered by using the different methodologies. Principally speaking, there is more interest in the diversity of the taxometric methodologies, the results and the linguistic interpretations which can be made from them.
