= Neogrammarian school =

School of linguistic thought

The Neogrammarians (German: Junggrammatiker, pronounced [ˈjʊŋɡʁaˌmatɪkɐ], lit. 'young grammarians') were a German school of linguists, originally at the University of Leipzig, in the late 19th and early 20th century who proposed the Neogrammarian hypothesis of the regularity of sound change. They are sometimes referred to as the Leipzig school in reference to their progenital institution, which would also produce a school for translatology – also called the Leipzig school – after the Second World War.

== Overview ==
According to the Neogrammarian hypothesis, a diachronic sound change affects simultaneously all words in which its environment is met, without exception. Verner's law is a famous example of the Neogrammarian hypothesis, as it resolved an apparent exception to Grimm's law. The Neogrammarian hypothesis was the first hypothesis of sound change to attempt to follow the principle of falsifiability according to the scientific method.

Subsequent researchers have questioned and challenged this hypothesis from two perspectives. First, adherents of lexical diffusion (where a sound change affects only a few words at first and then gradually spreads to other words) believe that some words change others. William Labov – often referred to as the father of sociolinguistics – famously fell into this camp. Second, some believe that it is possible for sound changes to observe grammatical conditioning. Nonetheless, both of these challenges to exceptionlessness remain controversial, and many investigators continue to adhere to the Neogrammarian doctrine. (Note: For a discussion and rejection of grammatical conditioning see Hill, Nathan W. (2014). "Grammatically conditioned sound change". Language and Linguistics Compass. 8 (6): 211–229. doi:10.1111/lnc3.12073. S2CID 19324261.)

Other contributions of the Neogrammarians to general linguistics were:

- The object of linguistic investigation is not the language system, but rather the idiolect, that is, language as it is localized in the individual, and therefore is directly observable.
- Autonomy of the sound level: being the most observable aspect of language, the sound level is seen as the most important level of description, and absolute autonomy of the sound level from syntax and semantics is assumed.
- Historicism: the chief goal of linguistic investigation is the description of the historical change of a language.
- Analogy: if the premise of the inviolability of sound laws fails, analogy can be applied as an explanation if plausible. Thus, exceptions are understood to be a (regular) adaptation to a related form.

Leading Neogrammarian linguists included:

- Otto Behaghel (1854–1936)
- Wilhelm Braune (1850–1926)
- Karl Brugmann (1849–1919)
- Berthold Delbrück (1842–1922)
- August Leskien (1840–1916)
- Adolf Noreen (1854–1925)
- Hermann Osthoff (1847–1909)
- Hermann Paul (1846–1921)
- Eduard Sievers (1850–1932)

Despite their strong influence in their time, the methods and goals of the Neogrammarians have been criticized for reducing the object of investigation to the idiolect; restricting themselves to the description of surface phenomena (sound level); overvaluation of historical languages and neglect of contemporary ones.

== See also ==
- Neolinguistics
