= Bockhorner Bach =

River in Germany

Location
- Country: Germany
- State: North Rhine-Westphalia

Physical characteristics
- Mouth
  - location: Eltingmühlenbach
  - coordinates: 52.0706°N 7.8772°E
- Length: 11.7 km (7.3 mi)

Basin features
- Progression: Eltingmühlenbach→ Glane→ Ems→ North Sea

Bockhorner Bach is a river of North Rhine-Westphalia, Germany. It flows into the Eltingmühlenbach near Ostbevern.

== See also ==
- List of rivers of North Rhine-Westphalia
