= Riedenbach =

River in Germany

Location
- Country: Germany
- States: North Rhine-Westphalia

Physical characteristics
- Mouth
  - location: Eltingmühlenbach
  - coordinates: 52.0783°N 7.8614°E

Basin features
- Progression: Eltingmühlenbach→ Glane→ Ems→ North Sea

Riedenbach is a small river of North Rhine-Westphalia, Germany. It is 6 km (3.7 mi) long and flows as a right tributary into the Eltingmühlenbach near Kattenvenne.

== See also ==
- List of rivers of North Rhine-Westphalia
