= August Schleicher =

German philologist (1821–1868)

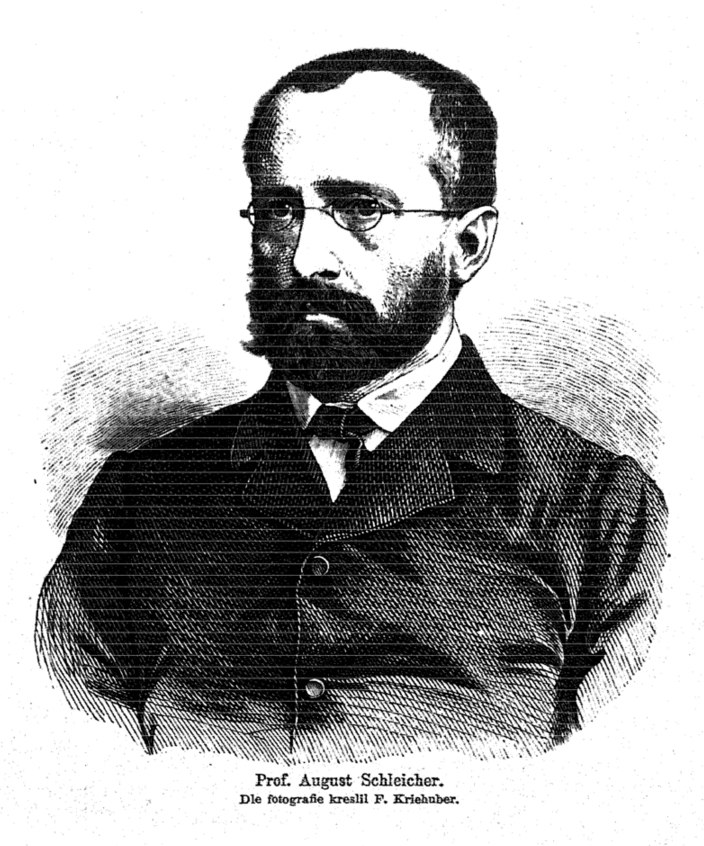
- Schleicher as drawn by Friedrich Kriehuber
- Born: 19 February 1821; Meiningen, Saxe-Meiningen, German Confederation
- Died: 6 December 1868 (aged 47); Jena, Saxe-Weimar-Eisenach, North German Confederation
- Known for: Contributions to Indo-European studies; Schleicher's fable

Academic background
- Education: University of Bonn
- Academic advisor: Friedrich Wilhelm Ritschl

Academic work
- Discipline: Linguistics
- Institutions: University of Jena
- Notable students: Jan Baudouin de Courtenay; August Leskien

August Schleicher (German: [ˈaʊɡʊst ˈʃlaɪçɐ]; 19 February 1821 – 6 December 1868) was a German linguist. Schleicher studied the Proto-Indo-European language and devised theories concerning historical linguistics. His great work was A Compendium of the Comparative Grammar of the Indo-European Languages in which he attempted to reconstruct the Proto-Indo-European language. To show how Indo-European might have looked, he created a short tale, Schleicher's fable, to exemplify the reconstructed vocabulary and aspects of Indo-European society inferred from it.

== Life ==
Schleicher was born in Meiningen, in the Duchy of Saxe-Meiningen, southwest of Weimar in the Thuringian Forest. He died from tuberculosis at the age of 47 in Jena, in the Duchy of Saxe-Weimar-Eisenach, in present-day Thuringia.

== Career ==
Schleicher was educated at the University of Tübingen and Bonn and taught at the Charles University in Prague and the University of Jena. He began his career studying theology and Oriental languages, especially Arabic, Hebrew, Sanskrit and Persian. Combining influences from the seemingly opposed camps of scientific materialism and the idealist philosophy of Georg Wilhelm Friedrich Hegel, he developed the theory that a language is an organism, with periods of development, maturity and senescence. Languages begin relatively simply. The state of primitive simplicity is followed by a period of growth and increased complexity, which eventually slows and results in a period of decay (1874:4):

As man has developed, so also has his language [...] even the simplest language is the product of a gradual growth: all higher forms of language have come out of simpler ones. [...] Language declines both in sound and in form. [...] The transition from the first to the second period is one of slower progress.

In 1850, Schleicher completed a monograph systematically describing European languages, Die Sprachen Europas in systematischer Uebersicht (The Languages of Europe in Systematic Perspective). He explicitly represented languages as natural organisms that could most conveniently be described using terms drawn from biology – genus, species, and variety – and arranged languages into a Stammbaum (family tree). He first introduced a graphic representation of a Stammbaum in an article published in 1853 entitled Die ersten Spaltungen des indogermanischen Urvolkes. By the time of the publication of his Deutsche Sprache (German language) (1860) he had begun to use tree diagrams to illustrate language development. Schleicher is commonly recognized as the first linguist to portray language evolution using the figure of a tree. Largely in reaction, Johannes Schmidt later proposed his 'Wave Theory' as an alternative model.

Schleicher is the author of the first scientific Compendium of Lithuanian language, which was published in German in 1856/57. Schleicher asserted that the Lithuanian language can compete with the Greek and Roman (Old Latin) languages in perfection of forms.

Schleicher was an advocate of the polygenesis of languages. He reasoned as follows (1876:2):

To assume one original universal language is impossible; there are rather many original languages: this is a certain result obtained by the comparative treatment of the languages of the world which have lived till now. Since languages are continually dying out, whilst no new ones practically arise, there must have been originally many more languages than at present. The number of original languages was therefore certainly far larger than has been supposed from the still-existing languages.

Schleicher's ideas on polygenesis had long-lasting influence, both directly and via their adoption by the biologist Ernst Haeckel. Ernst Haeckel was a German evolutionist and zoologist known for proposing the gastraea hypothesis.

In 1866, August Leskien, a pioneer of research into sound laws, began studying comparative linguistics as a student of August Schleicher at the University of Jena.

== Linguistic theories ==
=== Tree model ===
Schleicher helped popularize the tree model (also Stammbaum, genetic, or cladistic model) of historical linguistics, a model of the evolution of languages analogous to the concept of a family tree diagram, particularly a phylogenetic tree of the biological evolution of species. As with species, each language is assumed to have evolved from a single parent language, with languages that share a common ancestor belonging to the same language family.

The tree model has been a common method of describing genetic relationships between languages since the first attempts to do so. It is important for comparative linguistics, which involves using evidence from known languages and observed rules of linguistic evolution to identify and describe the hypothetical proto-languages ancestral to each language family, such as Proto-Indo-European and the Indo-European languages. However, this is largely a theoretical, qualitative pursuit, and linguists have always emphasized the inherent limitations of the tree model due to the large role played by geographic diffusion ("horizontal transmission") in language evolution, ranging from loanwords to patois languages that have multiple parent languages. The wave model was developed in 1872 by Schleicher's student Johannes Schmidt as an alternative to the tree model that incorporates geographic diffusion.

The tree model also has the same limitations as biological taxonomy with respect to the species problem of quantizing a continuous phenomenon that includes exceptions like ring species in biology and dialect continua in language. The concept of a linguistic linkage was developed in response and refers to a group of languages that evolved from a dialect continuum rather than from linguistically isolated child languages of a single language.

=== Comparative method ===
In linguistics, the comparative method is a technique for studying the development of languages by performing a feature-by-feature comparison of two or more languages with common descent from a shared ancestor and then extrapolating backwards to infer the properties of that ancestor. The comparative method may be contrasted with the method of internal reconstruction in which the internal development of a single language is inferred by the analysis of features within that language. Ordinarily, both methods are used together to reconstruct prehistoric phases of languages; to provide information missing about the historical record of a language; to discover the development of phonological, morphological and other linguistic systems and to confirm or to refute hypothesised relationships between languages. The comparative method was developed during the 19th century. Major contributions were made by the Danish scholars Rasmus Rask and Karl Verner and the German scholar Jacob Grimm.

The first linguist to offer reconstructed forms from a proto-language was Schleicher, in his Compendium der vergleichenden Grammatik der indogermanischen Sprachen, originally published in 1861. Here is Schleicher's explanation of why he offered reconstructed forms:

In the present work an attempt is made to set forth the inferred Indo-European original language side by side with its really existent derived languages. Besides the advantages offered by such a plan, in setting immediately before the eyes of the student the final results of the investigation in a more concrete form, and thereby rendering easier his insight into the nature of particular Indo-European languages, there is, I think, another of no less importance gained by it, namely that it shows the baselessness of the assumption that the non-Indian Indo-European languages were derived from Old-Indian (Sanskrit).

=== Schleicher's fable ===
Schleicher's fable is a text composed in a reconstructed version of the Proto-Indo-European (PIE) language, published by Schleicher in 1868. Schleicher was the first scholar to compose a text in PIE. The fable is entitled Avis akvāsas ka ("The Sheep [Ewe] and the Horses [Eoh]"). At later dates, various scholars have published revised versions of Schleicher's fable, as the idea of what PIE should look like has changed over time. The fable may serve as an illustration of the significant changes that the reconstructed language has gone through during the last 150 years of scholarly efforts.

== Works ==
- Sprachvergleichende Untersuchungen. / Zur vergleichenden Sprachgeschichte. (2 vols.) Bonn, H. B. Koenig (1848)
- Linguistische Untersuchungen. Part 2: Die Sprachen Europas in systematischer Uebersicht. Bonn, H. B. Koenig (1850); new ed. by Konrad Koerner, Amsterdam, John Benjamins (1982)
- Formenlehre der kirchenslawischen Sprache. (1852)
- Die ersten Spaltungen des indogermanischen Urvolkes. Allgemeine Zeitung fuer Wissenschaft und Literatur (August 1853)
- Handbuch der litauischen Sprache. (1st scientific compendium of Lithuanian language) (2 vols.) Weimar, H. Boehlau (1856/57)
- Litauische Maerchen, Sprichworte, Raetsel und Lieder. Weimar, H. Boehlau (1857)
- Volkstuemliches aus Sonneberg im Meininger Oberlande – Lautlehre der Sonneberger Mundart. Weimar, H. Boehlau (1858)
- Kurzer Abriss der Geschichte der italienischen Sprachen. Rheinisches Museum fuer Philologie 14.329-46. (1859)
- Die Deutsche Sprache. Stuttgart, J. G. Cotta (1860); new ed. by Johannes Schmidt, Stuttgart, J. G. Cotta (1888)
- Compendium der vergleichenden Grammatik der indogermanischen Sprachen. (Kurzer Abriss der indogermanischen Ursprache, des Altindischen, Altiranischen, Altgriechischen, Altitalischen, Altkeltischen, Altslawischen, Litauischen und Altdeutschen.) (2 vols.) Weimar, H. Boehlau (1861/62); reprinted by Minerva GmbH, Wissenschaftlicher Verlag, ISBN 3-8102-1071-4
- Die Darwinsche Theorie und die Sprachwissenschaft – offenes Sendschreiben an Herrn Dr. Ernst Haeckel (1st ed.). Weimar: H. Boehlau. 1863 – via Internet Archive.
- Die Bedeutung der Sprache für die Naturgeschichte des Menschen. Weimar, H. Boehlau (1865)
- Christian Donalitius Litauische Dichtungen (The Lithuanian Poetry of Christian Donelaitis), published by the Russian Academy of Sciences in St. Petersburg (1865)
- Darwinism Tested by the Science of Language. Translated by Bikkers, Alexander V.W. London: John Camden Hotten. 1869 – via Internet Archive.
- A Compendium of the Comparative Grammar of the Indo-European, Sanskrit, Greek, and Latin Languages, translated from the third German edition by Herbert Bendall. London: Trübner and Co (1874) (Actually an abridgement of the German original.)
- Laut- und Formenlehre der polabischen Sprache. reprinted by Saendig Reprint Verlag H. R. Wohlwend, ISBN 3-253-01908-X
- Sprachvergleichende Untersuchungen. reprinted by Minerva GmbH, Wissenschaftlicher Verlag, ISBN 3-8102-1072-2
- Die Formenlehre der kirchenslavischen Sprache erklaerend und vergleichend dargestellt. Reprint by H. Buske Verlag, Hamburg (1998), ISBN 3-87118-540-X

== Sources ==
- Bloomfield, Leonard (1984) [1933]. Language. Chicago and London: University of Chicago Press.
- François, Alexandre (2014), "Trees, Waves and Linkages: Models of Language Diversification" (PDF), in Bowern, Claire; Evans, Bethwyn (eds.), The Routledge Handbook of Historical Linguistics, London: Routledge, pp. 161–189, ISBN 978-0-41552-789-7
- Heggarty, Paul; Maguire, Warren; McMahon, April (2010). "Splits or waves? Trees or webs? How divergence measures and network analysis can unravel language histories". Philosophical Transactions of the Royal Society B. 365 (1559): 3829–3843. doi:10.1098/rstb.2010.0099. PMC 2981917. PMID 21041208.
- Lehmann, Winfred P. (1993). Theoretical Bases of Indo-European Linguistics. London: Routledge. ISBN 9780415082013.
- Schleicher, August (1874–1877) [1871]. A Compendium of the Comparative Grammar of the Indo-European, Sanskrit, Greek, and Latin Languages, translated from the third German edition. Translated by Bendall, Herbert. London: Trübner and Co.
- Salomon Lefmann: August Schleicher. Skizze. Leipzig (1870)
- Joachim Dietze: August Schleicher als Slawist. Sein Leben und Werk in der Sicht der Indogermanistik. Berlin, Akademie Verlag (1966)
- Konrad Körner: Linguistics and evolution theory (Three essays by August Schleicher, Ernst Haeckel and Wilhelm Bleek). Amsterdam-Philadelphia, John Benjamins Publishing Company (1983)
- Liba Taub: Evolutionary Ideas and "Empirical" Methods: The Analogy Between Language and Species in the Works of Lyell and Schleicher. British Journal for the History of Science 26, S. 171–193 (1993)
- Theodor Syllaba: August Schleicher und Böhmen. Prague, Karolinum (1995). ISBN 80-7066-942-X
