= IREDES =

Industry standard

IREDES, International Rock Excavation Data Exchange Standard, is an industry standard that is used on underground drilling machines. It aims to unify routines for the data exchange between mining equipment and office computer systems. It defines one "common electronic language" to be talked by the automation systems throughout the mine. In year 2000, IREDES was founded by the major players in the mining industry. Since then, the standard was developed, built and tested.

== Background ==
Modern mining machines today are controlled electronically via network. This kind of equipment provides enormous amounts of electronic reports and data. Before IREDES, there was no way of cost effectively exchanging the process information with databases, simulation tools and other enterprise level software. Any data exchange problem had to be solved by individual and expensive software development projects. To solve this problem, IREDES was founded to unify the data exchange format and method such that individual development effort can be minimized.

== Organization ==
IREDES is a not-for-profit organization located in Ladbergen, Germany. It is jointly financed by the member companies on a cost sharing basis. The standard documents are open to the public. They are accessible free of charge for members. Non-members can purchase the documents from the IREDES office for a small amount of contribution to the standardization work.

== Data Profiles ==
All the data profiles are based on Extensible Markup Language (XML). This is due to the high extendability and interoperability of the language. The current data profiles created with the contribution of board members are Drilling rig and LHD trucks. More profiles will be added in the future if needed.
