= Telgte Pilgrimage =

The pilgrimage from Osnabrück to Telgte takes place since 1852 on the second Sunday after the Feast of Saints Peter and Paul; it is known as Telgte pilgrimage ("Telgter Wallfahrt") or Osnabrück pilgrimage ("Osnabrücker Wallfahrt (nach Telgte)"). Each year approximately 8,000 pilgrims participate in the 47 km long walk along the B51 and more visitors arrive by bus or car.

== History ==
The pilgrimage was started by layman citizen of Osnabrück in 1852, approved by the Catholic Church under the condition, that no spirits or other alcoholic beverages will be drunk. In 1856 the procession was led for the first time by a priest.
Despite an interdiction during the wars in 1864-1866 (Second War of Schleswig) and 1914-1918 (World War I), during the Kulturkampf 1872-1882 and during Nazi Germany 1938-1944 many people went in small groups or alone on the pilgrimage to Telgte.

== Object of veneration ==
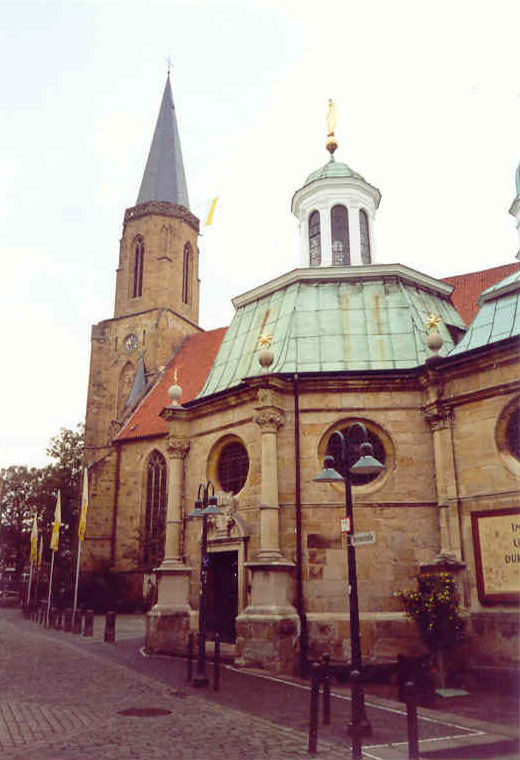
The chapel housing the pietà, in front of the church St. Clemens

The object of veneration is the statue of the painful Blessed Virgin Mary. It shows Mary, holding the body of Jesus after his death. The statue was made in 1370 and is thus one of the oldest portrayals of this motive (see Pietà). The statue is made from wood of the poplar and 150 cm in height.
In 1654 the Prince-Bishop Bernhard von Galen had a chapel built especially for the pietà and the pilgrimage. After this the interest in the Osnabrück pilgrimage increased even more.

== Course of the pilgrimage ==
The pilgrimage starts on Saturday at 1:30 am with masses in the churches St. Johann and St. Joseph in Osnabrück, and at 3 am the walk begins. The pilgrims walk through the village Oesede (Georgsmarienhütte) and the town Bad Iburg. They reach Glandorf at about 8 am where another mass is celebrated. At 10 am they rest in Oedingberge and a meditation is held. The procession reaches Ostbevern approximately at 1 pm and after a lunch break they set out for the last part of the walk. They reach Telgte at 4 pm and visit the pietà. With prayers for the night in the church St. Clemens, the schedule for the first day ends.
The first pilgrim mass starts on Sunday at 4:30 am with at least one other mass following for children and youths. Before they begin their way back at 8 am they come together for a last prayer. At 7 pm they reach The church of Peter and Paul in Oesede (Georgsmarienhütte), where the final meditation is held.
