= The king and the god =

Short dialogue in Proto-Indo-European

The king and the god (*H₃rḗḱs dei̯wós-kʷe) is the title of a short dialogue composed in the reconstructed Proto-Indo-European language. It is loosely based on the "King Harishchandra" episode of Aitareya Brahmana (7.14). S. K. Sen asked a number of Indo-Europeanists (Y. E. Arbeitman, Eric P. Hamp, Manfred Mayrhofer, Jaan Puhvel, Werner Winter, Winfred P. Lehmann) to reconstruct the PIE "parent" of the text.

== Dialogue ==
Hamp's/Sen's version from the EIEC (1997:503), which differs from Hamp's original version in replacing Hamp's Lughus with Sen's Werunos:

EIEC 1997's The king and the god
1997 text	Translation text
To rḗk̂s éh₁est. So n̥putlos éh₁est. So rḗk̂s súhₓnum éu̯el(e)t. Só tós(i̯)o ĝheutérm̥ (e)pr̥k̂sk̂et; "Súhₓnus moi ĝn̥h₁i̯otām!" So ĝheutḗr tom rḗĝm̥ éu̯eukʷet: "Ihₓgesu̯o deiu̯óm U̯érunom". So rḗk̂s deiu̯óm U̯erunom h₄úpo-sesore nu deiu̯óm (é)ihₓgeto: "k̂ludhí moi, ph̥ₐter U̯erune!" Deiu̯ós U̯érunos km̥ta diu̯ós égʷehₐt. "Kʷíd u̯elsi?" "U̯élmi súhₓnum." "Tód h₁éstu", u̯éukʷet loukós deiu̯os U̯erunos. Rēĝós pótnihₐ súhₓnum gegonh₁e.	Once there was a king. He childless was. This king a son desired. He his priest (pourer) asked. "(Let) son to me be born!" The priest the king said: "pray to the god Varuṇa". The king to the god Varuṇa approached now to the god to pray: "Hear me father Varuṇa!" The god Varuṇa down from heaven came. "What do you wish?" "I want a son." "(Let) this be (so)," said the bright god Varuṇa. The king's lady a son bore.

== Winfred P. Lehmann's version ==
Pótis gʰe ʔest. Só-kʷe n̥gn̥ʔtós ʔest, sū́num-kʷe wl̥next. So ǵʰutérm̥ pr̥ket: "Sū́nus moi gn̥hjotām!" ǵʰutḗr nu pótim weukʷet: "Jégeswo gʰi déiwom Wérunom." úpo pro pótis-kʷe déiwom sesore déiwom-kʷe jegto. "Kludʰí moi, dejwe Werune!" Só nu km̥ta diwós gʷāt. "Kʷód wl̥nexsi?" "Wl̥néxmi sū́num." "Tód ʔestu", wéwkʷet lewkós déjwos. Pótnī gʰi sū́num gegonʔe.

The EIEC spelling largely corresponds to that used in the Proto-Indo-European language article, with *hₐ for *h₂ and *hₓ for unspecified laryngeals *h. Lehmann attempts to give a more phonetical rendering, with x (voiceless velar fricative) for *h₂ and ʔ (glottal stop) for *h₁. Further differences include Lehmann's avoidance of the augment, and of the palato-alveolars as distinctive phonemes.

== Andrew Byrd's version ==
Linguist Andrew Byrd has produced and recorded his own translation to reconstructed PIE.

*H₃rḗḱs dei̯u̯ós-kʷe

H₃rḗḱs h₁est; só n̥putlós. H₃rḗḱs súh_{x}num u̯l̥nh₁to. Tósi̯o ǵʰéu̯torm̥ prēḱst: "Súh_{x}nus moi̯ ǵn̥h₁i̯etōd!" Ǵʰéu̯tōr tom h₃rḗǵm̥ u̯eu̯ked: "h₁i̯áǵesu̯o dei̯u̯óm U̯érunom". Úpo h₃rḗḱs dei̯u̯óm U̯érunom sesole nú dei̯u̯óm h₁i̯aǵeto. "ḱludʰí moi̯, pter U̯erune!" Dei̯u̯ós U̯érunos diu̯és km̥tá gʷah₂t. "Kʷíd u̯ēlh₁si?" "Súh_{x}num u̯ēlh₁mi." "Tód h₁estu", u̯éu̯ked leu̯kós dei̯u̯ós U̯érunos. Nu h₃réḱs pótnih₂ súh_{x}num ǵeǵonh₁e.

English translation:

Once there was a king. He was childless. The king wanted a son. He asked his priest: "May a son be born to me!" The priest said to the king: "Pray to the god Werunos." The king approached the god Werunos to pray now to the god. "Hear me, father Werunos!" The god Werunos came down from heaven. "What do you want?" "I want a son." "Let this be so," said the bright god Werunos. The king's lady bore a son.

== See also ==
- Schleicher's fable

== Bibliography ==
- Sen, SK (1994), "Proto-Indo-European, a multiangular view", Journal of Indo-European Studies, 22: 67–90.
- Encyclopedia of Indo-European Culture, 1997, p. 503.
- Lehmann, Winfred P. (1952). Proto-Indo-European Syntax. Austin: University of Texas Press. p. 129. ISBN 9780292733411., reprinted in 1980. Online version edited by University of Michigan, 2008 , on books.google:.
