= Aitareya Brahmana =

Brahmana text

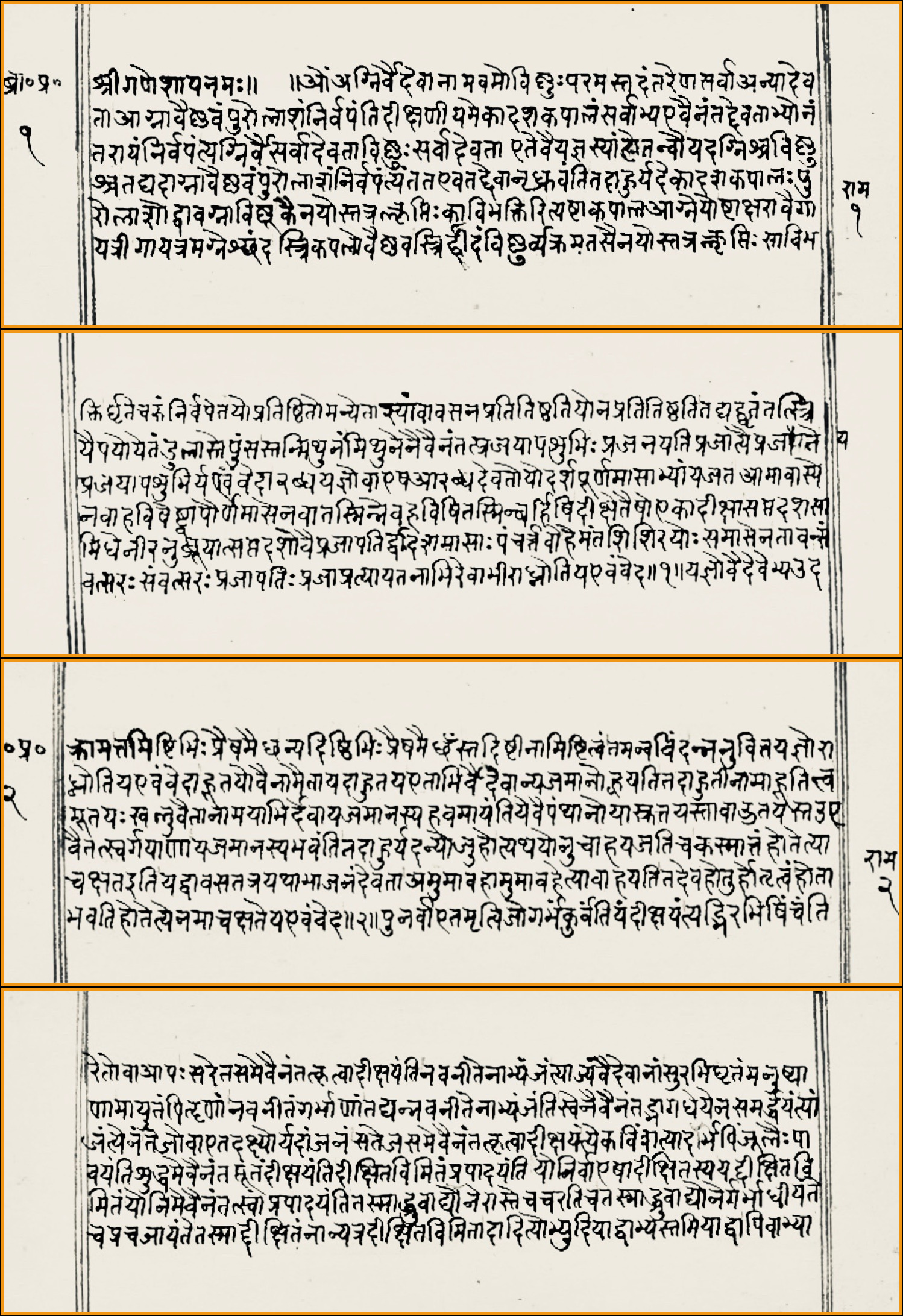
The first four pages of the Aitareya Brahmana

The Aitareya Brahmana (Sanskrit: ऐतरेय ब्राह्मण) is the Brahmana of the Shakala Shakha of the Rigveda, an ancient Indian collection of sacred hymns. This work, according to the tradition, is ascribed to Mahidasa Aitareya.

== Authorship ==
Sayana of Vijayanagara, a 14th century commentator, attributes the entire Aitareya Brahmana to a single man: Mahidasa Aitareya. In his introduction to the text, Sayana suggests that "Aitareya" is a matronymic name. Mahidasa's mother was "Itarā" (इतरा), whose name is derived from the Sanskrit word "itara". She was one of the wives of a great rishi (sage). The rishi preferred sons from his other wives over Mahidasa. Once he placed all his other sons on his lap, but ignored Mahidasa. On seeing tears in the eyes of her son, Itara prayed to the earth goddess Bhūmi, her kuladevi (tutelary deity). Bhūmi then appeared and gifted Mahidasa the knowledge contained in the Aitareya Brahmana.

Mahidasa is mentioned in other works before Sayana, such as the Chandogya Upanishad (3.16.7) and the Aitareya Aranyaka (2.1.7, 3.8). But none of these works mention Sayana's legend. The Aitareya Aranyaka is undoubtedly a composite work, and it is possible that the Aitareya Brahmana also had multiple authors. According to AB Keith, the present redaction of the work may be ascribed to Mahidasa, but even that cannot be said conclusively.

=== Identification with Asvalayana Brahmana ===
The Asvalayana Srautasutra and Asvalayana Grhyasutra, attributed to the sage Asvalayana, are the srautasutra and grhyasutra associated with the Aitareya Brahmana. Some Sanskrit texts also mention a text called Asvalayana Brahmana. For example, Raghunandana (c. 16th century CE), in his Malamasatattva, quotes a verse from what he calls the Asvalayana Brahmana. The verse is a slight variation of an Aitareya Brahmana verse.

The common view is that the Asvalayana Brahmana is simply another name for the Aitareya Brahmana. However, according to another theory, it might be a now-lost, similar but distinct Brahmana text.

== Date of composition ==
The Aitareya Brahmana with some certainty dates to the 1st millennium BCE, likely to its first half. Published estimates include the following:

- The translator of the Brāhmaṇa, A. B. Keith (1920), presented detailed arguments for a date in the 6th century BCE.
- H. H. Wilson (1866): "about 6 centuries B.C.".
- John G. R. Forlong (1906): "not later than 700 B.C."
- E. J. Rapson (1914): "possibly c. 500 B.C." for the "later books of the Aitareya Brahmana"
- Franklin Southworth (2004), referencing Krishnamurti (2003): "c. 7th century BCE"
- Jan N. Bremmer (2007): "c. 800 BC"

== Contents ==
Forty adhyayas (chapters) of this work are grouped under eight pañcikās (group of five). The following is an overview of its contents:

- Pañcikā I
  - Adhyāya I: The consecration rites
  - Adhyāya II: The introductory sacrifice
  - Adhyāya III: The buying and bringing of the Soma
  - Adhyāya IV: The Pravargya
  - Adhyāya V: The carrying forward of fire, Soma, and the offerings to the High Altar
- Pañcikā II
  - Adhyāya I: The animal sacrifice
  - Adhyāya II: The animal sacrifice and morning litany
  - Adhyāya III: The Aponaptriya and other ceremonies
  - Adhyāya IV: The cups of Indra and Vayu, Mitra and Varuna and the Ashvins
  - Adhyāya V: The Ajya Shastra
- Pañcikā III
  - Adhyāya I: The Prauga Shastra, the Vashat call and the Nivids
  - Adhyāya II: The Marutvatiya and the Nishkevalya Shastra
  - Adhyāya III: The Vaishvadeva and the Agnimaruta
  - Adhyāya IV: General considerations regarding the Agnishtoma
  - Adhyāya V: Certain details regarding the sacrifice
- Pañcikā IV
  - Adhyāya I: The Shodashin and the Atiratra sacrifices
  - Adhyāya II: The Ashvina Shastra and Gavam Ayana
  - Adhyāya III: The Shadahas and the Vishuvant
  - Adhyāya IV: The Dvadashaha rite
  - Adhyāya V: The first two days of the Dvadashaha
- Pañcikā V
  - Adhyāya I: The third and fourth days of the Dvadashaha
  - Adhyāya II: The fifth and sixth days of the Dvadashaha
  - Adhyāya III: The seventh and eighth days of the Dvadashaha
  - Adhyāya IV: The ninth and tenth days of the Dvadashaha
  - Adhyāya V: The Agnihotra and the Brahmana priest
- Pañcikā VI
  - Adhyāya I: The office of the Gravastut and Subrahmanya
  - Adhyāya II: The Shastras of the Hotrakas at Satras and Ahinas
  - Adhyāya III: Miscellaneous points as to the Hotrakas
  - Adhyāya IV: The Sampata hymns, the Valakhilyas and the Durohana
  - Adhyāya V: The Shilpa Shastras of the third pressing
- Pañcikā VII
  - Adhyāya I: The distribution of the portions of the victim of the sacrifice
  - Adhyāya II: Expiations of the errors in the sacrifice
  - Adhyāya III: The narrative of Shunahshepa
  - Adhyāya IV: The preparations for the royal consecretation
  - Adhyāya V: The sacrificial drink of the king
- Pañcikā VIII
  - Adhyāya I: The Stotras and Shastras of the Soma day
  - Adhyāya II: The anointing of the king
  - Adhyāya III: The great anointing of Indra
  - Adhyāya IV: The great anointing of the king
  - Adhyāya V: The office of Purohita

== Cosmography ==
Section 2.7

Astronomy played a significant role in Vedic rituals, which were conducted at different periods of a year. The Aitareya Brahmana (4.18) states the sun stays still for a period of 21 days, and reaches its highest point on vishuvanta, the middle day of this period. The gods feared that at this point, the sun would lose its balance, so they tied it with five ropes (the five "ropes" being five prayer verses). The vishuvanta is mentioned as an important day for rituals. The text also mentions that the sun burns with the greatest force after passing the meridian.

The Aitareya Brahmana (2.7) states:

The [sun] never really sets or rises. In that they think of him 'He is setting,' having reached the end of the day, he inverts himself; thus he makes evening below, day above. Again in that they think of him 'He is rising in the morning,' having reached the end of the night he inverts himself; thus he makes day below, night above. He never sets; indeed he never sets."

The Sun and the Earth

The Sun causes day and night on the earth,
because of revolution,
when there is night here, it is day on the other side,
the sun does not really rise or sink.

— Aitareya Brahmana III.44 (Rigveda)

According to Subhash Kak, this implies that according to the author of the verse, the sun does not move and it is the earth that moves, suggesting heliocentrism and rotation of a spherical Earth. According to Jyoti Bhusan Das Gupta, this verse implies that the author "clearly understood that days and nights were local rather than a global phenomenon". Das Gupta adds that the text's interest in the sun's position appears to be "purely ritualistic", and the verse cannot be conclusively taken as an evidence of the author's recognition of the earth as a sphere. According to K. C. Chattopadhyaya, the verse simply implies that the sun has two sides: one bright and the other dark.

Section 3.44

In section 3.44, among other things, the Aitareya Brahmana states (translation by Haug):

The sun does never rise or set. When people think the sun is setting (it is not so). For after having arrived at the end of the day it makes itself produce two opposite effects, making night to what is below and day to what is on the other side.
When they believe it rises in the morning (this supposed rising is thus to be explained for). Having reached the end of the night, it makes itself produce two opposite effects, making night to what is below and day to what is on the other side."

Aitareya Brahmana being a Vedic corpus text and scripture in Hinduism, and the lack of any Mount Meru theories in that text, the medieval era commentators such as Sayana had significant difficulty in reconciling the Vedic era and medieval era cosmographic theories. The medieval era Indian scholars kept the spherical and disc shape cosmography in the Puranas, while the astronomy (Siddhanta) texts for time keeping assumed the spherical assumptions.

== In linguistics ==
The king and the god is a text based on the "king Harishcandra and god Varuna" episode (7.14 … 33.2) of Aitareya Brahmana. It has been used to compare different reconstructions of Proto-Indo-European language.
