= Schleicher's fable =

Text by August Schleicher

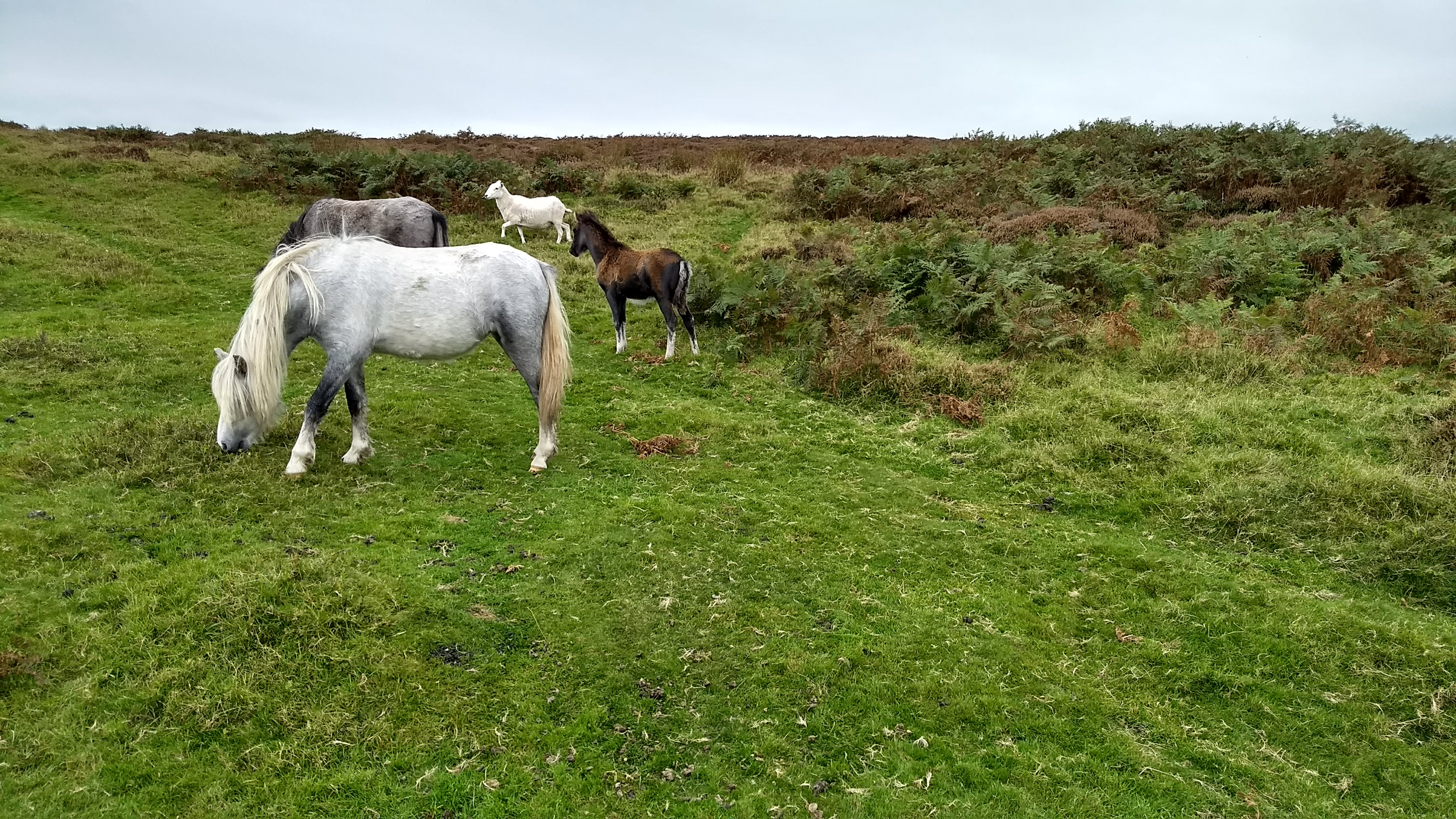
The fable describes a conversation between a sheep and several horses

Schleicher’s fable is a text composed as a reconstructed version of the Proto-Indo-European language (PIE), published by August Schleicher in 1868. Schleicher was the first scholar to compose a text in PIE. The fable is entitled *Avis akvāsas ka (‘The Sheep [Ewe] and the Horses’). At later dates, various scholars have published revised versions of Schleicher’s fable, as the idea of how PIE should be presented and pronounced has changed over time. The resulting parallel texts serve as an illustration of the significant changes that the reconstruction of the language has experienced during the last 150 years of scholarly efforts.

The first revision of Schleicher’s fable was made by Hermann Hirt (published by Arntz in 1939). A second revision was published by Winfred Lehmann and Ladislav Zgusta in 1979. Another version by Douglas Q. Adams appeared in the Encyclopedia of Indo-European Culture (1997:501). In 2007 Frederik Kortlandt published yet another version on his internet homepage.

== The Sheep and the Horses ==
=== Schleicher (1868) ===
Avis akvāsas ka

(1) Avis, jasmin varnā na ā ast, dadarka akvams, tam, vāgham garum vaghantam, tam, bhāram magham, tam, manum āku bharantam.

(2) Avis akvabhjams ā vavakat, "kard aghnutai mai vidanti manum akvams agantam."

(3) Akvāsas ā vavakant, "krudhi avai, kard aghnutai vividvant-svas: manus patis varnām avisāms karnauti svabhjam gharmam vastram avibhjams ka varnā na asti."

(4) Tat kukruvants avis agram ā bhugat.

==== Schleicher’s German translation ====
[Das] schaf und [die] rosse.

(1) [Ein] schaf, [auf] welchem wolle nicht war (ein geschorenes schaf) sah rosse, das [einen] schweren wagen fahrend, das [eine] große last, das [einen] menschen schnell tragend.

(2) [Das] schaf sprach [zu den] rossen: "[Das] herz wird beengt [in] mir (es thut mir herzlich leid), sehend [den] menschen [die] rosse treibend."

(3) [Die] rosse sprachen: "Höre schaf, [das] herz wird beengt [in den] gesehen-habenden (es thut uns herzlich leid, da wir wissen): [der] mensch, [der] herr macht [die] wolle [der] schafe [zu einem] warmen kleide [für] sich und [den] schafen ist nicht wolle (die schafe aber haben keine wolle mehr, sie werden geschoren; es geht ihnen noch schlechter als den rossen)."

(4) Dies gehört-habend bog (entwich) [das] schaf [auf das] feld (es machte sich aus dem staube).

==== English translation ====
The Sheep and the Horses

(1) A sheep that had no wool saw horses, one of them pulling a heavy wagon, one carrying a big load, and one carrying a man quickly.

(2) The sheep said to the horses: "My heart pains me, seeing a man driving horses."

(3) The horses said: "Listen, sheep, our hearts pain us when we see this: a man, the master, makes the wool of the sheep into a warm garment for himself. And the sheep has no wool."

(4) Having heard this, the sheep fled into the plain.

=== Hirt (1939) ===
owis ek'wōses-kʷe

(1) owis, jesmin wьlənā ne ēst, dedork'e ek'wons, tom, woghom gʷьrum weghontm̥, tom, bhorom megam, tom, gh'ьmonm̥ ōk'u bherontm̥.

(2) owis ek'womos ewьwekʷet, "k'ērd aghnutai moi widontei gh'ьmonm̥ ek'wons ag'ontm̥." (3) ek'wōses ewьwekʷont, "kl'udhi, owei! k'ērd aghnutai vidontmos: gh'ьmo, potis, wьlənām owjôm kʷr̥neuti sebhoi ghʷermom westrom; owimos-kʷe wьlənā ne esti."

(4) tod k'ek'ruwos owis ag'rom ebhuget.

=== Lehmann and Zgusta (1979) ===
owis eḱwōskʷe

(1) gʷərēi owis, kʷesyo wl̥hnā ne ēst, eḱwōns espeḱet, oinom ghe gʷr̥um woǵhom weǵhontm̥, oinomkʷe meǵam bhorom, oinomkʷe ǵhm̥enm̥ ōḱu bherontm̥.

(2) owis nu eḱwobh(y)os (eḱwomos) ewewkʷet, "ḱēr aghnutoi moi eḱwōns aǵontm̥ nerm̥ widn̥tei".

(3) eḱwōs tu ewewkʷont, "ḱludhi, owei, ḱēr ghe aghnutoi n̥smei widn̥tbh(y)os (widn̥tmos): nēr, potis, owiōm r̥ wl̥hnām sebhi gʷhermom westrom kʷrn̥euti. Neǵhi owiōm wl̥hnā esti."

(4) tod ḱeḱluwōs owis aǵrom ebhuget.

=== Danka (1986) ===
owis ek'woi kʷe

(1) owis, jesmin wl̥nā ne ēst, dedork'e ek'wons woghom gʷr̥um weghontn̥s — bhorom meg'əm, monum ōk'u bherontn̥s.

(2) owis ek'wobhos eweukʷet, "K'erd aghnutai moi widn̥tei g'hm̥onm̥ ek'wons ag'ontm̥".

(3) ek'woi eweukʷont, "K'ludhi, owi, k'erd aghnutai dedr̥k'usbhos: monus potis wl̥nām owiōm temneti: sebhei ghʷermom westrom — owibhos kʷe wl̥nā ne esti."

(4) tod k'ek'luwōs owis ag'rom ebhuget.

=== Adams (1997) ===
h₂óu̯is h₁ék̂u̯ōs-kʷe

(1) gʷr̥hₓḗi h₂óu̯is, kʷési̯o u̯lh₂néh₄ ne (h₁é) est, h₁ék̂u̯ons spék̂et, h₁oinom ghe gʷr̥hₓúm u̯óĝhom u̯éĝhontm̥ h₁oinom-kʷe méĝhₐm bhórom, h₁oinom-kʷe ĝhménm̥ hₓṓk̂u bhérontm̥.

(2) h₂óu̯is tu h₁ek̂u̯oibh(i̯)os u̯eukʷét, "k̂ḗr hₐeghnutór moi h₁ék̂u̯ons hₐéĝontm̥ hₐnérm̥ u̯idn̥tbh(i̯)os."

(3) h₁ék̂u̯ōs tu u̯eukʷónt, "k̂ludhí, h₂óu̯ei, k̂ḗr ghe hₐeghnutór n̥sméi u̯idn̥tbh(i̯)ós. hₐnḗr, pótis, h₂éu̯i̯om r̥ u̯l̥h₂néhₐm sebhi kʷr̥néuti nu gʷhérmom u̯éstrom néĝhi h₂éu̯i̯om u̯l̥h₂néhₐ h₁ésti."

(4) tód k̂ek̂luu̯ṓs h₂óu̯is hₐéĝrom bhugét.

=== Lühr (2008) ===
h₂ówis h₁ék’wōskʷe

(1) h₂ówis, (H)jésmin h₂wlh₂néh₂ ne éh₁est, dedork'e (h₁)ék'wons, tóm, wóg'ʰom gʷérh₂um wég'ʰontm, tóm, bʰórom még'oh₂m, tóm, dʰg'ʰémonm h₂oHk'ú bʰérontm.

(2) h₂ówis (h₁)ék'wobʰos ewewkʷe(t), "k'ḗrd h₂gʰnutoj moj widntéj dʰg'ʰmónm (h₁)ék'wons h₂ég'ontm."

(3) (h₁)ék'wōs ewewkʷ, "k'ludʰí, h₂ówi! k'ḗrd h₂gʰnutoj widntbʰós: dʰg'ʰémō(n), pótis, h₂wlnéh₂m h₂ówjom kʷnewti sébʰoj gʷʰérmom wéstrom; h₂éwibʰoskʷe h₂wlh₂néh₂ né h₁esti."

(4) tód k'ek'luwṓs h₂ówis h₂ég'rom ebʰuge(t).

=== Voyles and Barrack (2009) ===
owis eḱwōs kʷe

(1) owis, jāi wl̥nā ne eest, dedorḱe eḱwons, tom woǵʰom gʷr̥um weǵʰontm̥, tom bʰorom meǵm̥, tom ǵʰm̥onm̥ ōku bʰerontm̥.

(2) owis eḱwobʰjos eweket, "ḱerd angʰetai moi widontei ǵʰm̥onm̥ eḱwons aǵontm̥."

(3) eḱwos wewekur, "ḱludʰe, owei! Ḱerd angʰetai widontbʰjos: ǵʰm̥on, potis, wl̥nam owijōm kʷr̥neti soi gʷʰermom westrom; owibʰjos kʷe wl̥nā ne esti".

(4) tod ḱeḱlōts owis aǵrom ebʰuget.

=== Kortlandt (2007, revised 2010) ===
(1) ʕʷeuis i ʕueli nēʔst ʔeḱ:ums uēit:, t:o kʷ'rʕeum uoḱom uḱent:m, t:o mḱ'eʕm porom, t:o tḱmenm ʔoʔḱ:u prent:m.

(2) uēuk:t ʕʷeuis ʔiḱ:uos, "ʕetḱo ʔme ḱ:ērt ʕnerm uit'ent:i ʔeḱ:ums ʕḱ'ent:m."

(3) ueuk:nt: ʔiḱ:ues, "ḱ:luti ʕʷue, ʕetḱo nsme ḱ:ērt: uit'ent:i, ʕnēr p:ot:is ʕʷuiom ʕueli sue kʷermom uesti kʷ:rneut:i, ʕʷuēi kʷ:e ʕueli neʔsti."

(4) t:o ḱ:eḱ:luus ʕʷeuis pleʕnom pēuk't.

After the separation of Anatolian and Tocharian:

(1) ʕʷeuis ioi ʕulʔneʕ nēʔs ʔeḱuns ʔe uēi'd, tom 'gʷrʕeum uoǵom ueǵontm, tom m'ǵeʕm borom, tom dǵmenm ʔoʔḱu berontm.

(2) ʔe uēuk ʕʷeuis ʔeḱumus, "ʕedǵo ʔmoi ḱēr'd ʕnerm ui'denti ʔeḱuns ʕe'ǵontm."

(3) ʔe ueukn'd ʔiḱues, "ḱludi ʕʷuei, ʕedǵo nsmi ḱēr'd ui'denti, ʕnēr potis ʕʷuiom ʕulʔneʕm subi gʷermom uesti kʷrneuti, ʕʷuimus kʷe ʕulʔneʕ neʔsti."

(4) to'd ḱeḱluus ʕʷeuis pleʕnom bēu'g.

=== Byrd (2013) ===
h₂óu̯is h₁éḱu̯ōs-kʷe

(1) h₂áu̯ei̯ h₁i̯osméi̯ h₂u̯l̥h₁náh₂ né h₁ést, só h₁éḱu̯oms derḱt, só gʷr̥hₓúm u̯óǵʰom u̯eǵʰed; só méǵh₂m̥ bʰórom; só dʰǵʰémonm̥ h₂ṓḱu bʰered.

(2) h₂óu̯is h₁ékʷoi̯bʰi̯os u̯eu̯ked, "dʰǵʰémonm̥ spéḱi̯oh₂ h₁éḱu̯oms-kʷe h₂áǵeti, ḱḗr moi̯ agʰnutor."

(3) h₁éḱu̯ōs tu u̯eu̯kond, "ḱludʰí, h₂ou̯ei̯! tód spéḱi̯omes, n̥sméi̯ agʰnutór ḱḗr: dʰǵʰémō, pótis, sē h₂áu̯i̯es h₂u̯l̥h₁náh₂ gʷʰérmom u̯éstrom u̯ept, h₂áu̯ibʰi̯os tu h₂u̯l̥h₁náh₂ né h₁esti".

(4) tód ḱeḱluu̯ṓs h₂óu̯is h₂aǵróm bʰuged.

== Notable differences ==
Some of the differences between the texts are simply varying spelling conventions: *w and *u̯, for example, are only different symbols to indicate the same sound, a consonantal *u, so that *wóĝhom and *u̯óǵʰom are actually the same reconstruction. However, many other differences are to be explained by widely diverging opinions concerning the phonological and morphological systems of PIE.

Schleicher’s reconstruction assumed that the o/e vocalism was secondary, and his version of PIE is based much more closely on Sanskrit than modern reconstructions.

Hirt introduced the o/e vocalism, syllabic resonants, labiovelars and palatalized velars.

Lehmann and Zgusta introduced a few alternative lexemes (the relative pronoun *kʷesjo; the word *nēr ‘man’), and made some use of laryngeals: their text features an h (*wl̥hnā) for what they seem to accept as a single laryngeal of PIE.

Adams was the first one to represent fully the laryngeal theory in his version of the fable. Judging from the text, he seems to assume four different laryngeal phonemes. Consequently, Adams’ text no longer shows long ā.

Kortlandt’s version is a radical deviation from the prior texts in a number of ways. First, he conforms to the glottalic theory, representing glottalic plosives with a following apostrophe (t’) and omitting aspirated voiced plosives. Second, he substitutes the abstract laryngeal signs with their supposed phonetic values: *h_{1} = *ʔ (glottal stop), *h_{2} = *ʕ (voiced pharyngeal fricative), *h_{3} = *ʕʷ (pharyngeal fricative with labialization). Kortlandt also has a different opinion about ablaut grades in many verbal and nominal forms, compared to the other scholars.

== Cultural references ==
- In Ridley Scott’s 2012 film Prometheus, the android character ‘David’ (played by Michael Fassbender) was shown reciting the Schleicher's Fable after a holographic teacher (played by Dr. Anil Biltoo, also the film's linguistics consultant.)

== See also ==
- The king and the god, a short dialogue written in reconstructed Proto-Indo-European

== Bibliography ==
- Arntz, Helmut (ed.), Hirt, Hermann: Die Hauptprobleme der indogermanischen Sprachwissenschaft. Niemeyer, Halle a.d. Saale 1939 (Sammlung kurzer Grammatiken germanischer Dialekte. B. Ergänzungsheft 4)
- Kortlandt, Frederik. 2007. For Bernard Comrie.
- Lehmann, W., and L. Zgusta. 1979. Schleicher’s tale after a century. In Festschrift for Oswald Szemerényi on the Occasion of his 65th Birthday, ed. B. Brogyanyi, 455–66. Amsterdam.
- Lühr, Rosemarie Von Berthold Delbrück bis Ferdinand Sommer: Die Herausbildung der Indogermanistik in Jena
- Mallory, J. P. and Adams, D. Q.: Encyclopedia of Indo-European Culture. London, 1997. p. 500ff.
- Schleicher, August: Fabel in indogermanischer Ursprache. In: Beiträge zur vergleichenden Sprachforschung auf dem Gebiete der arischen, celtischen und slawischen Sprachen. 5/1868. Dümmler, Berlin, p. 206–208
