= Telgte =

- Town
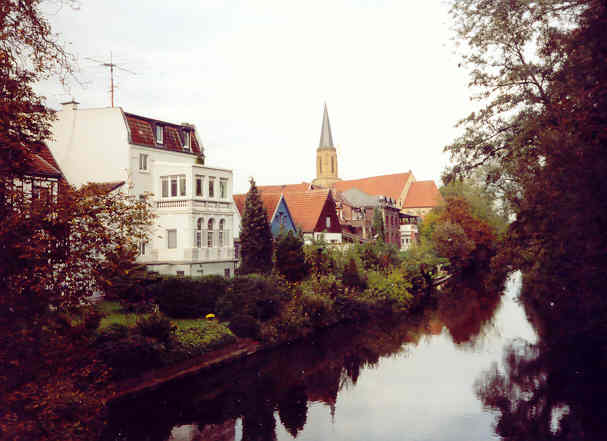
- Old Town and River Ems

- Flag Coat of arms

- Location of Telgte within Warendorf district
- Interactive map of Telgte
- Location within Germany Location within North Rhine-Westphalia
- Coordinates: 51°58′55″N 7°47′08″E
- Country: Germany
- State: North Rhine-Westphalia
- Admin. region: Münster
- District: Warendorf

Government
  - Mayor (2020–25): Wolfgang Pieper (Greens)

Area
  - Total: 90.84 km^{2} (35.07 sq mi)
- Elevation: 54 m (177 ft)

Population (2025-12-31)
  - Total: 20,128
  - Density: 221.6/km^{2} (573.9/sq mi)
- Time zone: UTC+01:00 (CET)
  - Summer (DST): UTC+02:00 (CEST)
- Postal codes: 48291
- Dialling codes: 02504
- Vehicle registration: WAF, BE
- Website: www.telgte.de

Telgte (German pronunciation: [ˈtɛlktə], regionally [ˈtɛlçtə]; Low German: Teegte) is a town in the Warendorf district, North Rhine-Westphalia, Germany, on the river Ems 12 km east of Münster and 15 km west of Warendorf. Telgte is famous as a place of pilgrimage, the Marian pilgrimage from Osnabrück to Telgte.

== Geography ==
=== Neighboring Communities ===
Telgte borders the cities Münster, Greven, Ostbevern, Warendorf, and Everswinkel.

=== City Districts ===
Telgte divides into the main city and two districts, Westbevern-Dorf and Westbevern-Vadrup.

Until 1974, Westbevern (population: about 4000; area of 24,46 km²) was an independent town, with Dorf, Vadrup, and Brock as its districts. Since the reform of the municipal area reform, Brock has been a part of the neighboring town Ostbevern. The Bever runs as a tributary to the Ems through Westbevern. With its double-mill at the Bever, Haus Langen is a popular destination for tourists. For a couple of years, the neo-gothic church St Cornelius and Cyprian was a part of the parish community St. Marien (Telgte and Westbevern.)

== History ==
The region around Telgte was already inhabited by Saxon tribes during post-Roman times. In the course of the Saxon wars at the hands of Charlemagne, this region was Christianised. Ludgerus, the first bishop of Münster, built a church in Telgte. This parish church was probably a wooden construct.

Telgte developed at a fork of larger trade routes to the North Sea and Baltic Sea, due to a ford that was able to cross the river, Ems.

Telgte received town privileges in 1238. 1469 Telgte is mentioned as a member of the Hanseatic League.

Around 1500 there were several large fires. In one of these fires, the old church perished. Prince-Bishop Franz von Waldeck of Münster was granted asylum in Telgte during the Münster Rebellion of the Anabaptists in the 1530s. Telgte suffered from the plague three times, so in 1599 more than half of the inhabitants died.

The Jewish community in Telgte existed until 1941. During Kristallnacht, the synagogue was desecrated and destroyed and the cemetery was removed in 1942, by Brownshirts and students. Today, commemorative plaques at these locations remind us of Telgte's Jewish history.

During the 20th century, Telgte's structure was formed, adding Westbevern to its district.

== Culture ==
Telgte is famous for the annual Telgte Pilgrimage, the second-largest pilgrimage in Germany. Dedicated to the Blessed Virgin Mary and beginning in Osnabrück, the summertime pilgrimage regularly consists of 8,000 pilgrims. Approximately 150,000 pilgrims visit Telgte annually. Telgte is also known for its Nativity Museum (Krippenmuseum) and its fair (the Birth of Mary Market).

Nobel Prize winner Günter Grass's novel The Meeting at Telgte (Das Treffen in Telgte) is set in Telgte during the negotiations of the Peace of Westphalia which ended the Thirty Years' War.

== Culture and sights ==
Telgte is nationally known for its nativity museum, which is today part of the RELíGIO - Westphalian Museum for Religious Culture, the Birth of Mary Market with a show jumping tournament that attracts around 40,000 visitors every September, and the Telgter Pilgrimage, the annual Marian pilgrimage from Osnabrück to Telgte. It is one of the largest in Germany with around 8,000 pilgrims regularly. Up to 150,000 pilgrims come to Telgte every year.

In addition, the carriage pilgrimage takes place once a year on Ascension Day, where over 100 carriages often present themselves. This pilgrimage attracts many spectators to the city center and the Planwiese, a large event area in the city.

Other events that take place on the Planwiese in Telgte: a show of hot air balloons, the Montgolfiade, takes place on the first weekend in May and the large Birth of the Birth of Mary Market takes place in September. Medieval festivals also take place regularly during summer. Until 2014, Germany's largest medieval Christmas market with lights took place in Telgte during Advent.

Exhibitions are also occasionally held in Telgte. In 2009, Christel Lechner's Everyday People were on display, and in the summer of 2011 HA Schult's Trash People were on display. From April to July 2015, the Everyday People were once again exhibited in the historic part of the city.

The forest cemetery Lauheide with over 35,000 graves is located in the area of the city of Telgte near the city border of Münster. The Office for Green Spaces and Environmental Protection of the City of Münster, which owns the cemetery, is responsible for it.

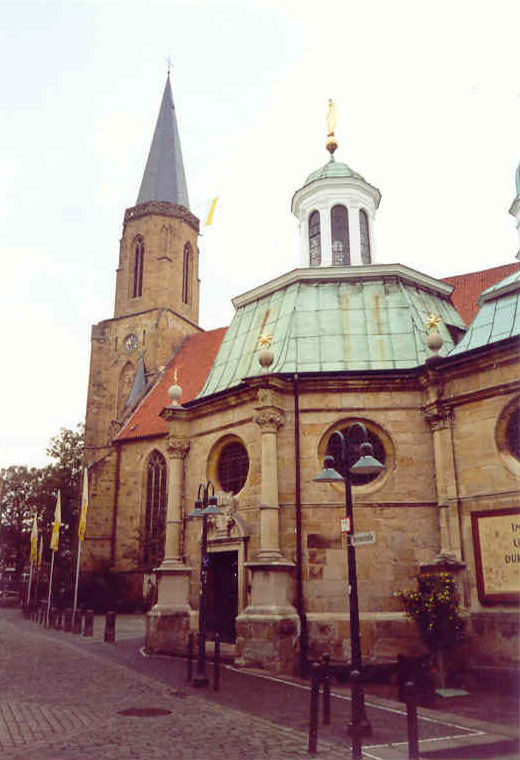
Pilgrimage chapel in front of the St. Clemens church

=== Museums ===
- Under the name RELíGIO - Westphalian Museum for Religious Culture, the former Museum Heimathaus Münsterland and the Crib Museum were brought together with a common concept. The name has existed since 2011, and the new conception of the museum dates back to 2012. The RELíGIO museum is the first religious museum in Germany to present world religions, denominations and denominational differences, religious festivals, the history of the Telgter pilgrimage, the life and work of Cardinal von Galens, and the important Telgter famine cloth from 1623, on more than 1000 square meters.

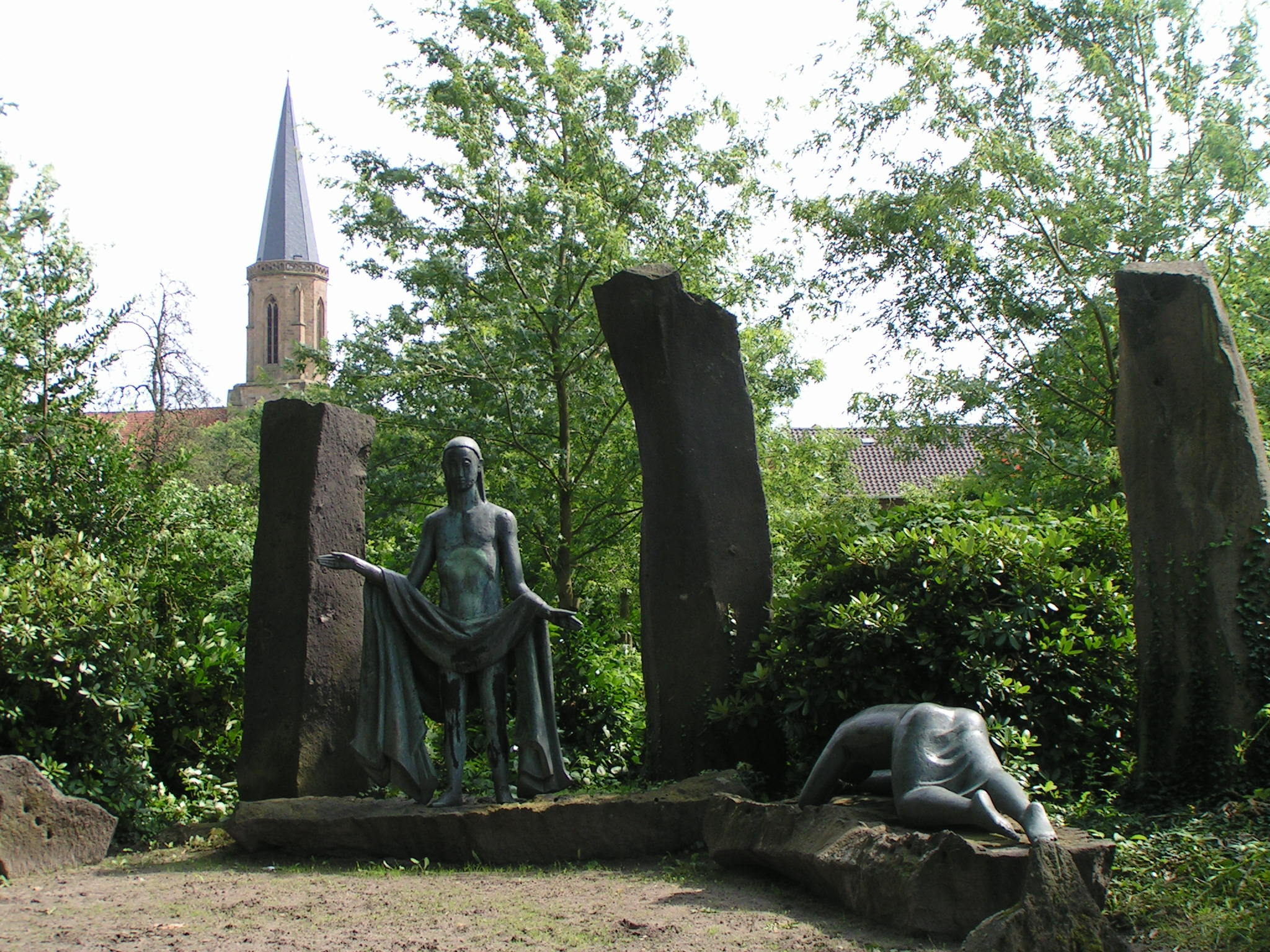
Kreuzweg am Emsufer

- The Corn Distillery Museum is a historic building that provides a detailed insight into the history of the corn distillery in Münster. The building was constructed in 1900, and production continued until 1979. The technical system is still almost completely preserved. A gallery on the second floor offers space for exhibitions of contemporary art.

=== Buildings ===
→ Main article: List of monuments in Telgte

- The pilgrimage chapel, a Marian chapel, is a baroque, octagonal central building from around 1650. The destination of the pilgrimages is the Telgter Gnadenbild, a Pietà (sculpture of Mary with the Fire rider at the Medieval Spectaculum the corpse of Jesus) in this chapel. According to legend, it is said to have been carved from the Marienlinde (an old city gate tree).
- The Propsteikirche St. Clemens, built between 1522 and 1558, is a Gothic hall church. It lies on the Ems and near the pilgrimage chapel.
- Christoph-Bernsmeyer-Haus: North of the Propsteikirche there is a striking building, the so-called Große Mühle, directly on the Emswehr. There was a mill in Telgte very early on. On the left bank of the Ems behind the church was the large grain mill (today's Christoph-Bernsmeyer-Haus), on the right bank there was the oil and fulling mill, which was demolished around 1900. The large, well-decorated coat of arms on the gable of the Great Mill contains a chronogram with the year 1754 in the first two lines. The Westphalian Baroque master builder Johann Conrad Schlaun was involved in the planning of the renovation work.
- This former grain mill was thoroughly renovated in 1976/77 and taken over by the Mauritzer Franciscan nuns, whose founder Father Johann Christoph Bernsmeyer (1777-1858) was the vicar in Telgte for a long time and therefore gave the house its name. The building was a convalescent home for Franciscan sisters until 2014 and today houses a priory of the Maria Stella Matutina Sisters' Community, a contemplative religious community.
- Emsstraße 25, a half-timbered building, built around 1600
- Herrenstrasse 7, a half-timbered building from the second half of the 17th century, originally built as a vicarage house
- Königstraße 35, a one-story half-timbered building erected in 1500, has been rebuilt several times
- Markt 4, brick eaves house from 1778
- Ritterstraße 2, a one-story half-timbered building with a gable projecting twice over rope band cleats, erected around 1600
- Ritterstraße 4, The one-story half-timbered building, whose gable protrudes twice over Knaggen, was erected in 1625
- Steinstraße 4, warehouse, built around 1500

=== Tree Monument ===
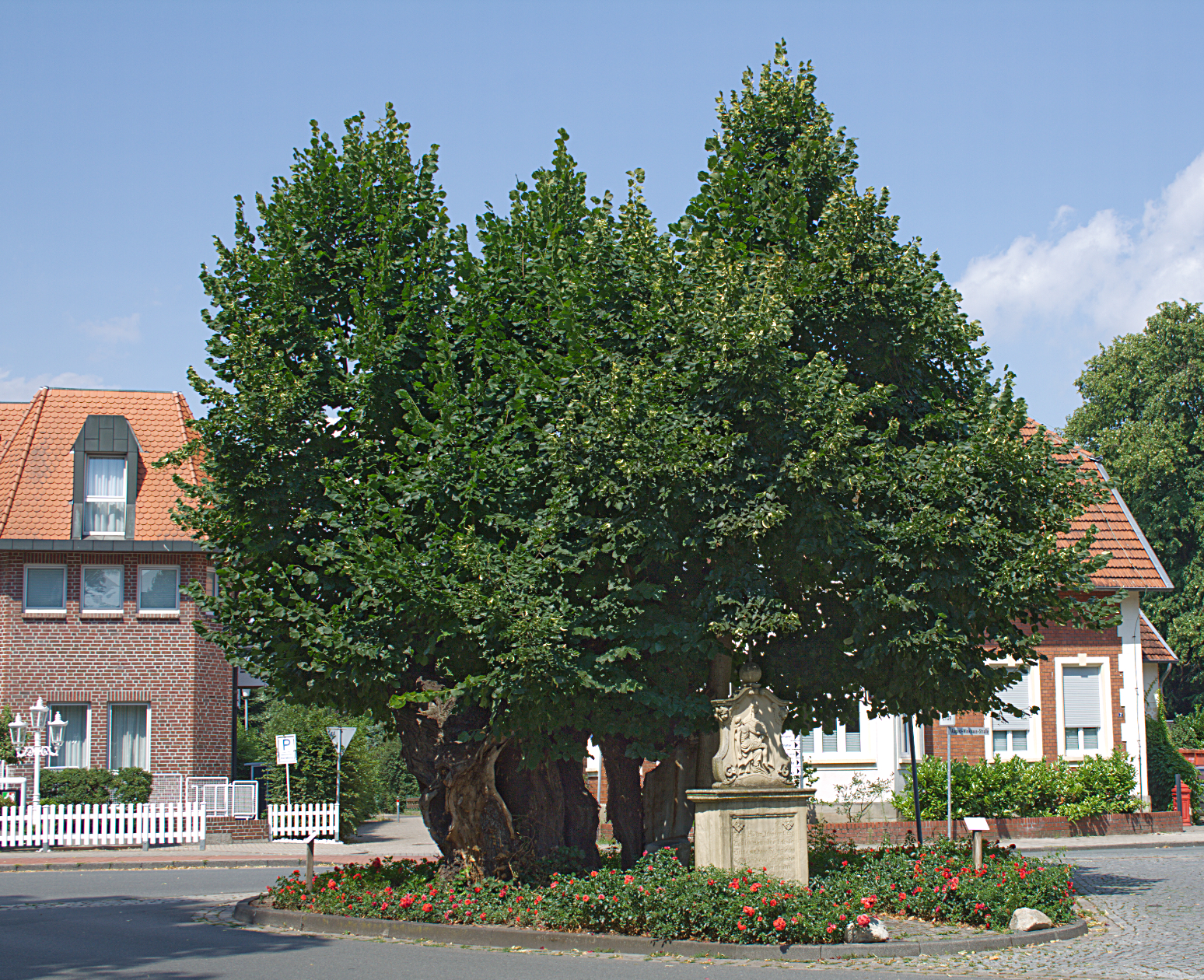
Marienlinde at the Münstertor

==== Marienlinde ====
The Marienlinde is an approx. 750-year-old, heritage-protected summer linden, and is one of the oldest trees in Germany. The ‘tree veteran’ stands at the northwestern city gate, the Münster gate. The linden tree got its name from the image of the Virgin Mary that is said to have been carved from its wood.

== Population ==
Historical population

Year	Pop.	±% p.a.
1818	4,437	—
1843	5,166	+0.61%
1871	5,360	+0.13%
1890	6,109	+0.69%
1905	6,692	+0.61%
1913	7,006	+0.57%
1921	7,719	+1.22%
1927	8,445	+1.51%
1933	8,727	+0.55%
1939	9,698	+1.77%
1944	10,923	+2.41%
1946	12,989	+9.05%
1951	13,576	+0.89%
1956	13,383	−0.29%

Year	Pop.	±% p.a.
1961	13,767	+0.57%
1965	13,254	−0.94%
1970	14,035	+1.15%
1975	15,165	+1.56%
1980	16,253	+1.40%
1985	16,663	+0.50%
1990	17,358	+0.82%
1995	18,472	+1.25%
2000	18,992	+0.56%
2005	19,528	+0.56%
2010	19,114	−0.43%
2015	19,557	+0.46%
2020	19,841	+0.29%
2025	20,128	+0.29%

Source: Landesdatabank Nordrhein-Westfalen (1965-2025)

== Politics ==
The city of Telgte consists of three parts: Telgte, Westbevern and Westbevern-Vadrup. Until the 1970s Westbevern was an independently administered village that consisted of Vadrup and Brock (Brock was incorporated into Ostbevern in a communal reform). Through Westbevern flows the river Bever, a tributary of the Ems. An attractive tourist destination is Haus Langen, with a former double mill at the Bever.

=== International relations ===
Telgte is twinned with:

- Polanica-Zdrój, Poland
- Stupino, Russia
- Tomball, United States

=== Mayors since 1946 ===
Term	Mayor
1946–1947	Wilhelm Lütke-Schwienhorst, CDU
1947–1949	Ferdinand Busch, CDU
1949–1951	Friedrich Sube, Zentrum
1951–1952	Heinrich Decker, CDU
1952–1964	Bernhard Rumphorst, CDU
1964–1967	Wilhelm Hotte, CDU
1967–1969	Friedrich Koppernagel, CDU
1969–1975	Günter Karthaus, CDU
1975–1978	Albert Bruens, CDU
1978–1984	Günter Karthaus, CDU
1984–1996	Reinhold Hotte, CDU
1996–1999	Klaus Beck, SPD
1999–2004	Ulrich Roeingh, CDU
2004–2009	Dr. Dietrich Meendermann, CDU
since 2010	Wolfgang Pieper, BÜNDNIS 90/DIE GRÜNEN

=== Notable people ===
- Josef Koch (1895-1983), medical practitioner
- Alfons Lütke-Westhues (1930-2004), Show Jumper, Olympic Gold Medalist
- August Lütke-Westhues (1926-2000), Eventing Rider, Olympic Silver Medalist
- August Winkhaus, Manufacturer, Founder of Aug. Winkhaus GmbH & Co. KG
- Eduard Böhmer (1829–1872), Deputy of German Parliament
- Salomon Lefmann (1831–1912), Philologist
- Ludwig Brefeld (1837–1907), Politician
- Oscar Brefeld (1839–1925), Botanist and Mycologist
- Louis Aronstein (1841–1913), Chemist
- Alfons Lütke-Westhues (1930–2004), Show Jumper
- Peter Janssens (1934–1998), Musician, Composer
- Ludwig Rotthowe (1937–2017), Railway Photographer
- Philipp R. Hömberg (1939–2001), Prehistorian and Monument Conservationist
- Falk Dörr, born 1941, Soccer Player (Preußen Münster)
- Harald Norpoth, born 1942, long-distance runner
- Erwin Kostedde, born 1946, Soccer Player
- Norbert Gellenbeck, born 1964, Artist, black smith and metal worker
- Johannes Bellmann, born 1965, Educational scientist and professor at the University of Münster
- Markus Berges, born 1966, Singer, Songwriter and Writer
- Ulrich Schäfer, born 1967, Business Journalist
- Nadine Ernsting-Krienke, born 1974, Hockey Player
- André Großfeld, born 1977, Cook, awarded with a Michelin Guide star
- Malte Spitz, born 1984, Politician (Alliance 90/The Greens)
- Sophie Kleinherne, born 2000, Soccer Player

=== Sons and daughters of the town ===
- Salomon Lefmann (1831-1912), philologist
- Alfons Lütke-Westhues (1930-2004), jumping rider, winner of the Olympic Team Gold Medal 1956
- Harald Norpoth (born 1942), long distance runner and Olympic Silver Medal Winner (1964)
- Nadine Ernsting-Krienke (born 1974), hockey player
- Malte Spitz (born 1984), politician (Alliance '90/The Greens)
