= Bever (Ems) =

River in Germany

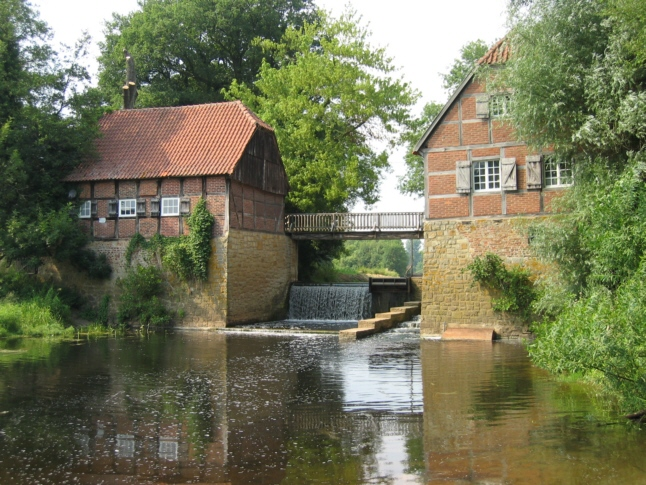

Location
- Country: Germany
- State: North Rhine-Westphalia

Physical characteristics
- Mouth
  - location: Ems
  - coordinates: 52°00′42″N 7°45′30″E
- Length: 39.4 km (24.5 mi)
- Basin size: 217 km^{2} (84 sq mi)

Basin features
- Progression: Ems→ North Sea

The Bever (German pronunciation: [ˈbeːvɐ]) is an approximately 40-kilometre-long (25 mi) river in western Germany, right tributary of the river Ems. It has its springs in the Teutoburg Forest. It runs through the northern part of North Rhine-Westphalia and flows into the Ems near Telgte (Westbevern). Another town on the Bever is Ostbevern.
