= Salomon Lefmann =

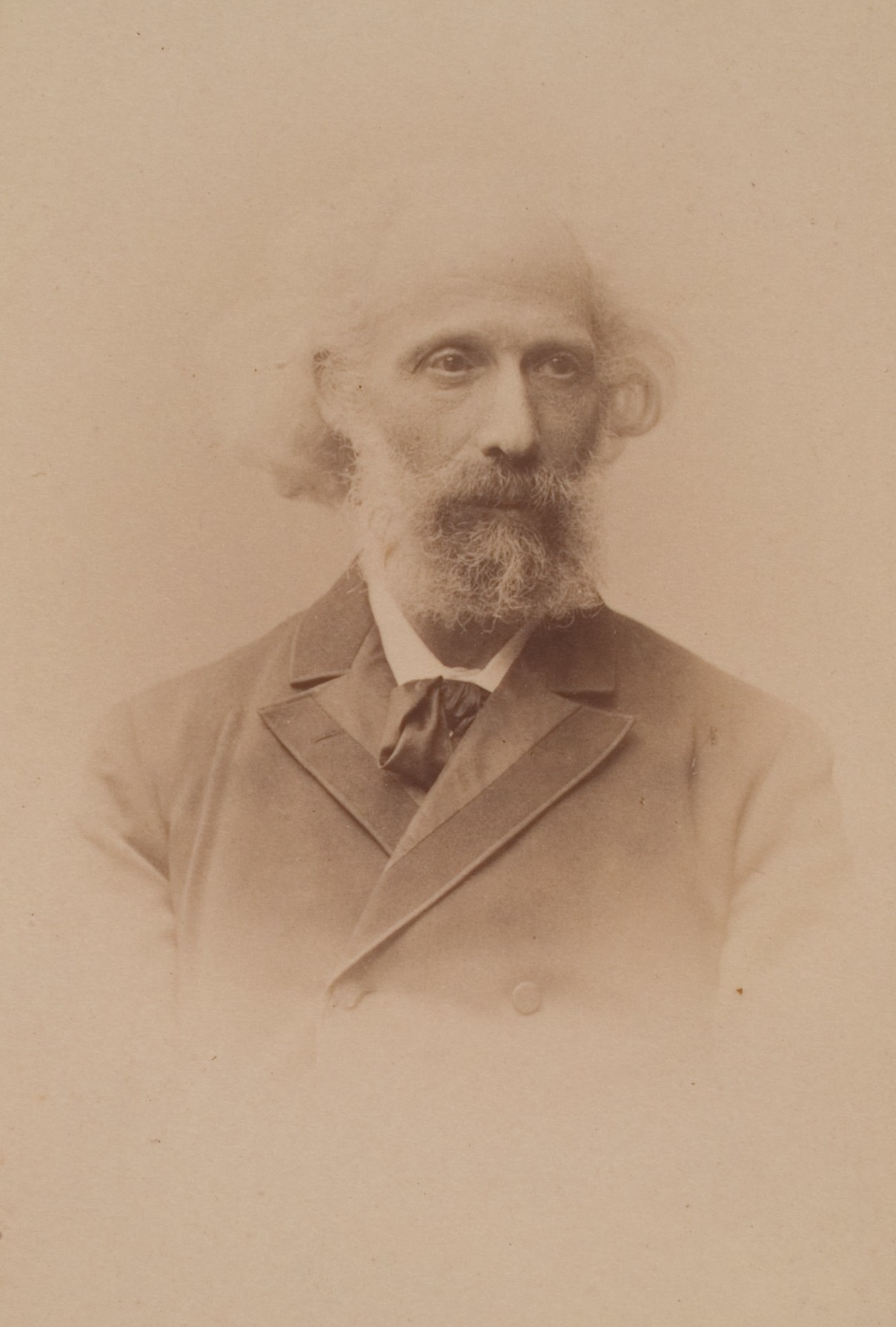
Salomon Lefmann

Salomon Lefmann (born in Telgte, Westphalia, 25 December 1831; died in Heidelberg, 14 January 1912) was a German Jewish philologist.

He was educated at the Jewish school of his native town, at the seminary and academy at Münster, and at the universities of Heidelberg, Berlin, and Paris (Ph.D., Berlin, 1864). In 1866 he became privat-docent of Sanskrit at Heidelberg, where he later became an associate professor (1870) and honorary professor (1901).

Lefmann's principal philological works were:

- De Aristotelis in Hominum Educatione Principiis, Berlin, 1864.
- August Schleicher: Skizze, Leipzig, 1870 (biography of linguist August Schleicher).
- Lalita Vistara (edited and translated; Lalita-vistara), Halle, 1883, 1902.
- Geschichte des Alten Indiens, Berlin, 1879–90; 2nd edition, 1898 ("History of ancient India").
- Franz Bopp: Sein Leben und seine Wissenschaft, 2 volumes., Berlin, 1891–97 ("Franz Bopp; his life and science").

Through his "Ueber Deutsche Rechtschreibung" (in "Virchow und Holzendorff's Wissenschaftliche Vorträge", 1871) and "Zur Deutschen Rechtschreibung" (in "Münchner Allgemeine Zeitung", 1871, nos. 136, 209, 274) Lefmann took part in the movement for the establishment of a uniform system of spelling in German.

Lefmann took part in Jewish communal affairs. While preparing himself for the university and during his employment as a public teacher he held also the positions of tutor and school-master in several small communities of Westphalia; and at Heidelberg in 1887 he was president of the Zedaka Verein, a society for the aid of the poor.
