= Joseph Annegarn =

German Catholic theologian, professor of church history and popular writer

Personal details
- Born: 13 October 1794 Ostbevern, Westphalia
- Died: 8 July 1843 (aged 48) Braunsberg, East Prussia

Joseph Annegarn (13 October 1794 – 8 July 1843) was a German Catholic theologian, professor of church history and popular writer.

== Works ==
His Allgemeine Weltgeschichte für die katholische Jugend ("Universal History") was written primarily for Catholic youth, and published in eight volumes in 1827–29. His purpose was frankly Catholic. It became a standard work in Catholic families in Germany,

Features of the History are the numerous character sketches of historical personages and the chronological tables. Succeeding editors kept it abreast with historical research.

Annegarn was also the author of Handbuch der Patrologie (1839). Annegarn's works also include:

- Rechnenbüchlein für Kinder in den Elementarschulen, Münster 1825.
- Lesebuch für die fähigere Jugend in Elementarschulen oder: Lesestücke aus der Natur- und Erdbeschreibung und der vaterländischen Geschichte, Münster 1828.
- Handbuch der Geographie für die Jugend, Münster 1834 (ab der 5. Aufl. 1851 bearb. von Heinrich Overhage).
- Geschichte der Heiligen des Münsterischen Kirchenkalenders und Erklärung der kirchlichen Feste und Zeiten und deren Cäremonien, Münster 1836
- Naturgeschichte für die Jugend in Volksschulen, Münster 1837.
