= Quantization =

Quantization is the process of constraining an input from a continuous or otherwise large set of values (such as the real numbers) to a discrete set (such as the integers). The term quantization may refer to:

== Signal processing ==
- Quantization (signal processing), in mathematics and digital signal processing
  - Quantization (image processing)
    - Color quantization
  - Vector quantization
  - Quantization (music)

== Physics ==
- Quantization (physics)
  - Canonical quantization
  - Geometric quantization
- Discrete spectrum, or otherwise discrete quantity
  - Spatial quantization
  - Charge quantization

== Computing ==
- Quantization for LLMs (neural network weight optimization)

== Linguistics ==
- Quantization (linguistics)

== Similar terms ==
- Quantification (science)
