= Ladbergen =

- Municipality
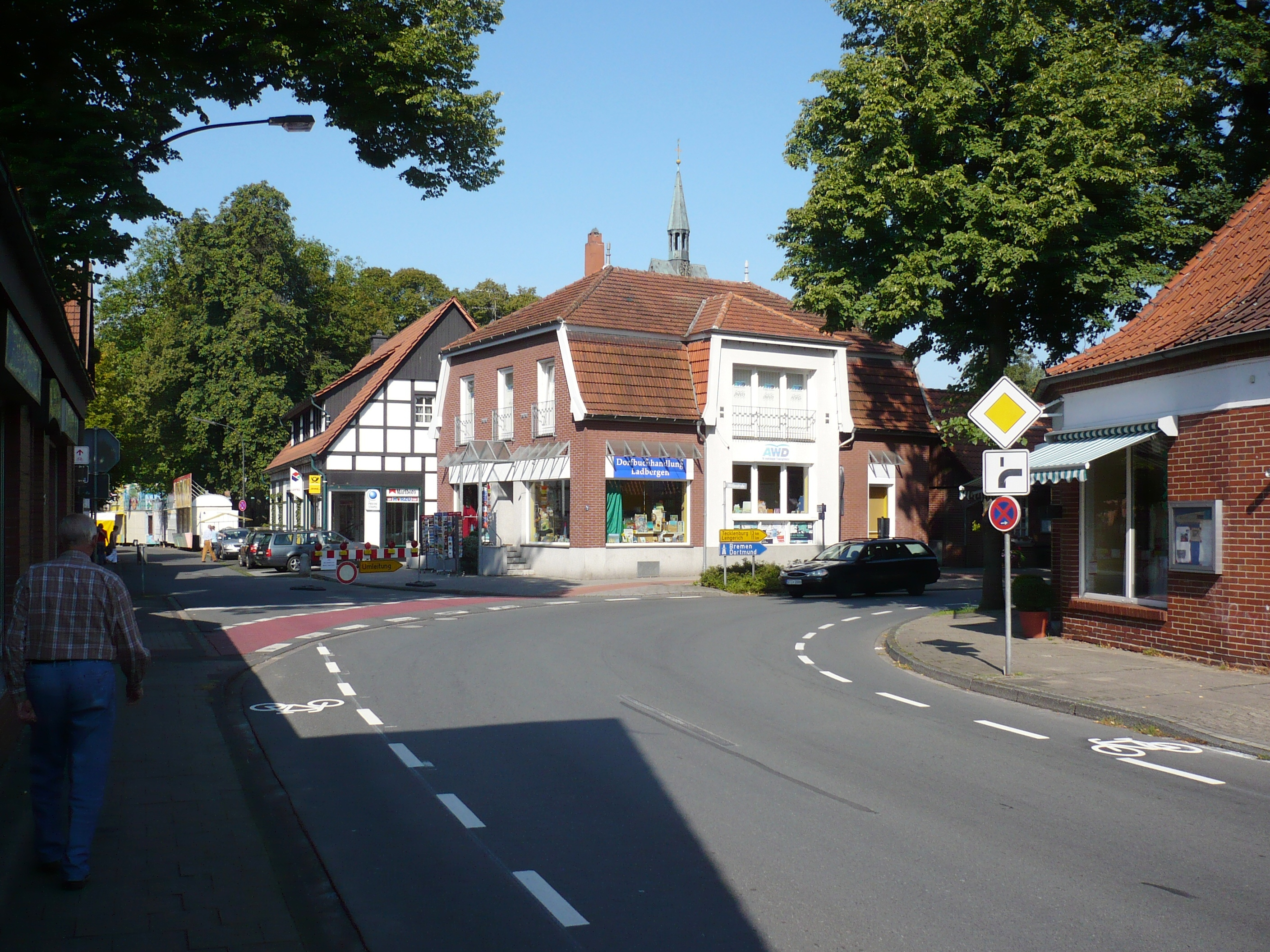
- Ladbergen Dorfstraße

- Coat of arms

- Location of Ladbergen within Steinfurt district
- Interactive map of Ladbergen
- Location within Germany Location within North Rhine-Westphalia
- Coordinates: 52°08′12″N 7°44′14″E
- Country: Germany
- State: North Rhine-Westphalia
- Admin. region: Münster
- District: Steinfurt
- Subdivisions: Village (centre), Hölter, Wester and Overbeck

Government
  - Mayor (2020–25): Torsten Buller (Ind.)

Area
  - Total: 52.34 km^{2} (20.21 sq mi)
- Elevation: 51.8 m (170 ft)

Population (2025-12-31)
  - Total: 6,876
  - Density: 131.4/km^{2} (340.3/sq mi)
- Time zone: UTC+01:00 (CET)
  - Summer (DST): UTC+02:00 (CEST)
- Postal codes: 49549
- Dialling codes: 05485
- Vehicle registration: ST, TE, BF
- Website: www.ladbergen.de

Ladbergen (Westphalian: Ladbiärgen) is a municipality in the district of Steinfurt, in North Rhine-Westphalia, Germany. It is situated near the Dortmund-Ems Canal, approximately 25 km south-west of Osnabrück and 20 km north-east of Münster.

== Geography ==
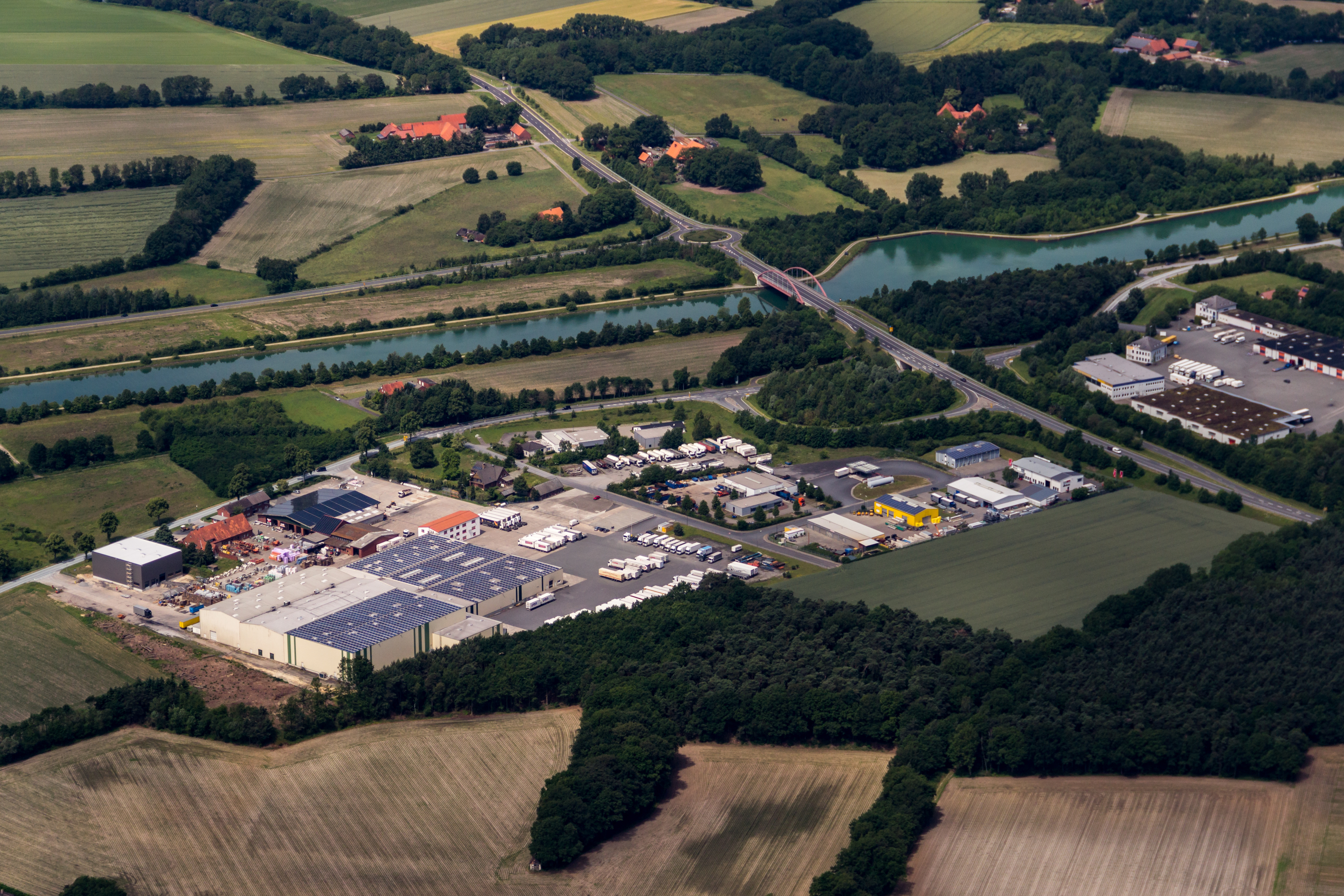
Westladbergener Brücke bridge where the B 475 federal highway crosses the Dortmund-Ems Canal in Ladbergen.

The municipality is situated in the Tecklenburg country in the middle between the cities Münster and Osnabrück. Because of its central location between these two cities Ladbergen is well accessible by the Autobahn (motorway/freeway) A 1 (Ladbergen junction) and the Bundesstraße (federal highway) B 475. The Dortmund-Ems Canal (canal port Ladbergen) situated on the western municipal border and Münster Osnabrück Airport (FMO) are located a few kilometers from the centre of Ladbergen. Unlike the name part of "bergen" suggests, Ladbergen offers no mountainous or hilly landscape, but is situated at a relatively uniform level between 48.1 m (158 ft) and 55.5 m (182 ft) with a mean elevation of 51.8 m (170 ft) above sea level. Two streams flow through Ladbergen, the Ladbergen Aa and the Ladbergen Mühlenbach that both flow eventually into the Glane stream.

The municipality Ladbergen is subdivided in the village(centre) and the surrounding rural areas Hölter, Wester and Overbeck.

=== Neighboring municipalities and towns ===
Ladbergen borders on:

- Tecklenburg
- Lengerich
- Lienen
- Ostbevern
- Greven
- Saerbeck

== Population ==
Historical population

Year	Pop.	±% p.a.
1965	4,040	—
1970	4,478	+2.08%
1975	5,505	+4.22%
1980	6,225	+2.49%
1985	6,353	+0.41%
1990	5,797	−1.82%
1995	6,058	+0.88%

Year	Pop.	±% p.a.
2000	6,425	+1.18%
2005	6,431	+0.02%
2010	6,383	−0.15%
2015	6,694	+0.96%
2020	6,775	+0.24%
2025	6,876	+0.30%

Source: Landesdatabank Nordrhein-Westfalen

With a population of 6,876 (as of December 2025) Ladbergen is the second smallest independent municipality in the district of Steinfurt (just before Metelen with 6,540 inhabitants). The camping facilities offer about 700 more people a second home in Ladbergen.

Regarding religion the largest part of the population is Protestant (Lutheranism), a smaller part is Roman Catholic.

== History ==
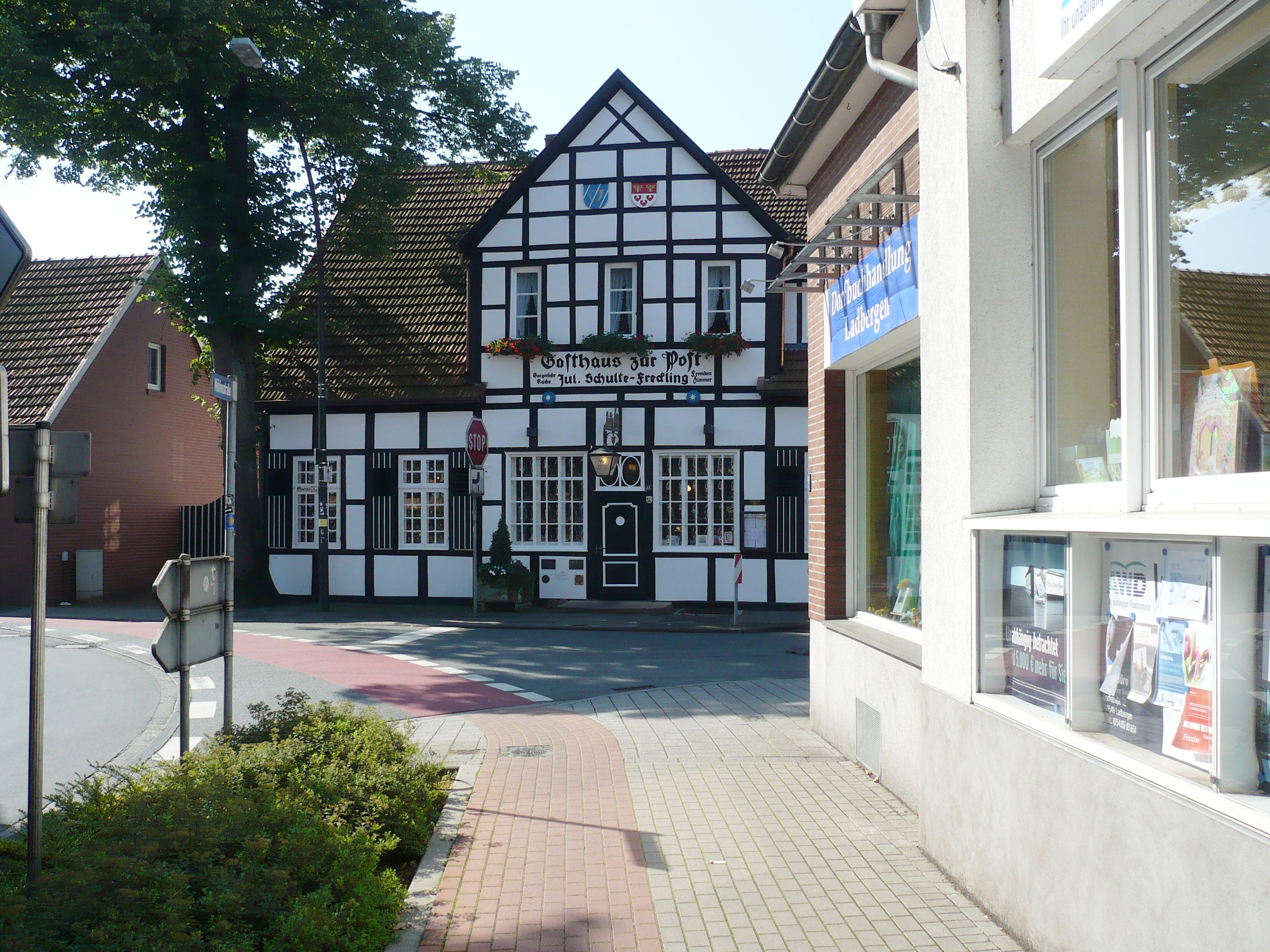
Restaurant in a half-timbered house

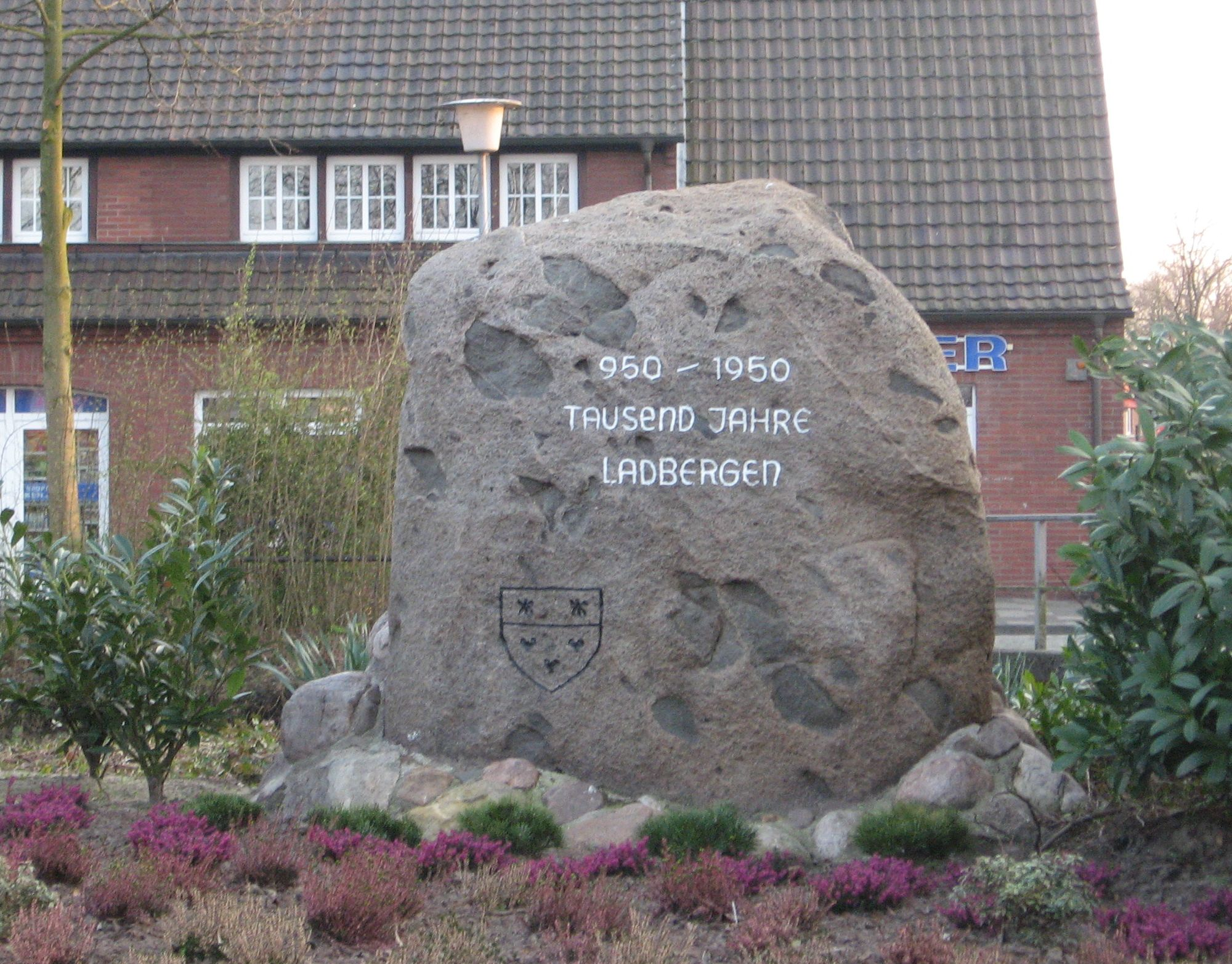
950 - 1950, 1000 years-stone, Ladbergen.

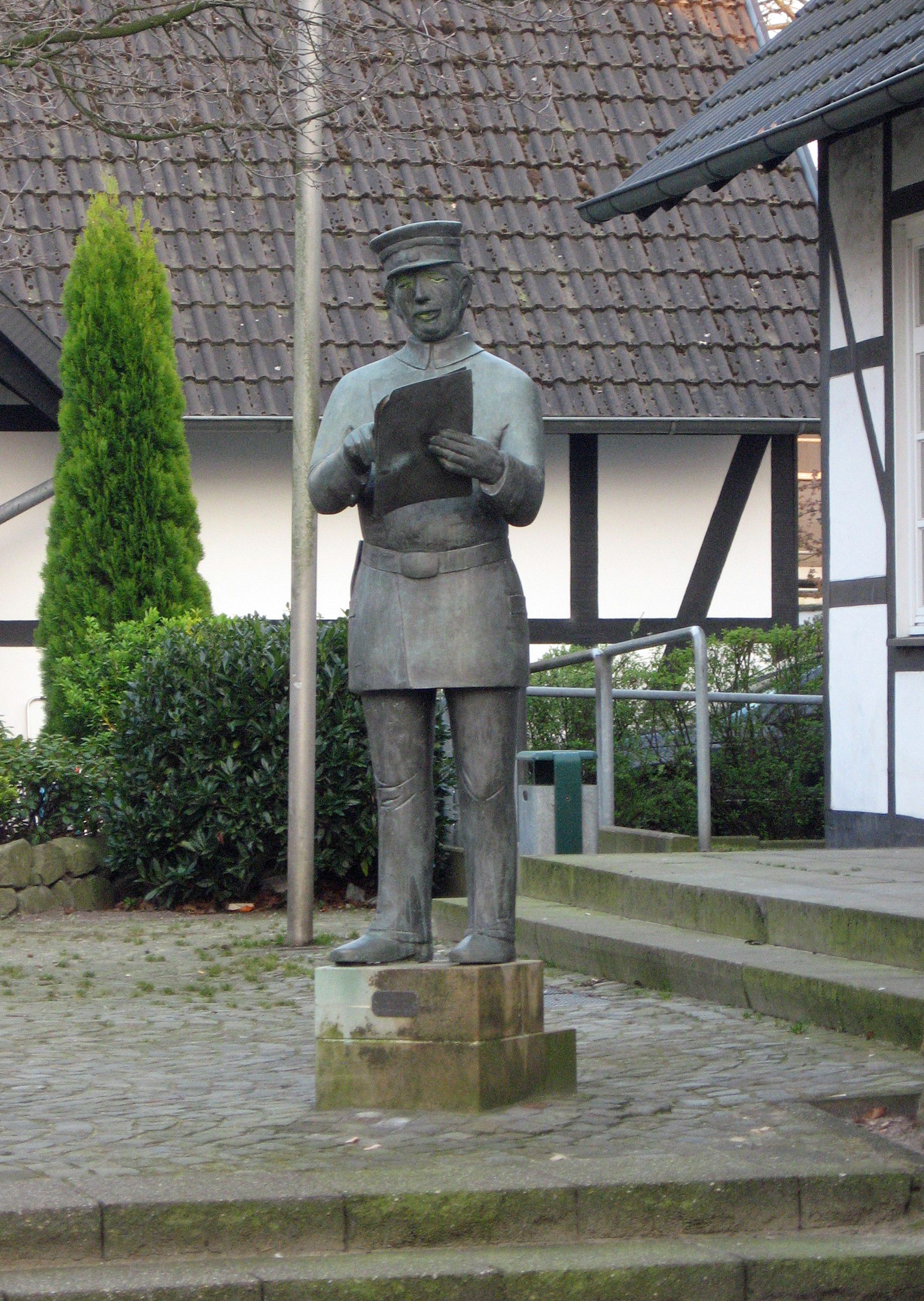
Bronze sculpture of a historic Afrouper (community messenger). Before newspapers existed until August 1965, the citizens were informed – on Sundays after church – of official announcements and other news by the Afrouper.

Because of graves found, it is assumed that the territory of the municipality Ladbergen was already populated in the Bronze Age. Ladbergen got mentioned first in 950 in a certificate of the Freckenhorst monastery.

In the year 1149, the municipality was assigned as an independent parish by the Diocese of Münster. In 1170 the parish was taken over by the Diocese of Osnabrück.

In 1246 the Ladberger Marktbund (Ladbergen Marketfederation) was founded by representatives of the cities Münster, Osnabrück, Minden and Herford. This was a precursor of other forms of cooperation in Westphalia and the Hanseatic League.

Around 1400, the western parts of the community were lost to the Diocese of Münster. As a result, the population of Ladbergen until after World War II remained religiously almost exclusively Protestant (Lutheranism).

In the year 1650 Ladbergen gained political autonomy for the first time. In 1707 Ladbergen with the entire Duchy of Tecklenburg got incorporated into the Kingdom of Prussia. After 1816 Ladbergen belonged to the Landkreis Münster and was later assigned to the Landkreis Tecklenburg.

In 1855 Ladbergen lost its political autonomy, and was administratively unified with the village Brochterbeck. This situation remained unchanged up to 1907, when Ladbergen was assigned to Tecklenburg.

During World War II the vicinity of Ladbergen was heavily bombed. It has been proven that Ladbergen was the place in the former German Reich where the highest number of bombs per square metre fell.

Allied bombers tried to destroy the two Dortmund-Ems Canal culverts to the west of Ladbergen, where the canal passes over the Glane. The aim was to render the canal unusable for an extended period for the shipping traffic between the North Sea and the Ruhr region, which was vital to the German war economy.

To defend the canal there were two heavy 105 mm Flak locations in Ladbergen, supported by smaller anti-aircraft guns. Batteries of 105 mm guns were usually left to defend major cities. This indicates the importance of the canal to the overall German war effort.

The first attacks in July and September 1940 caused only minor damage to the canal, which did not hinder shipping traffic. During Operation Garlic in September 1943, in which heavy Lancaster bombers attacked the canal in low-level flights, five out of eight bombers were lost along with their crews, without the culverts being destroyed due to poor visibility. It was not until the attack on the night of 4–5 November 1944 that the Alte Fahrt (the old branch of the canal) and its culvert were completely destroyed. The Alte Fahrt was not repaired. Further attacks involving up to 212 Lancaster bombers and 11 Mosquito multi-role fighter-bombers every three to four weeks ensured that the 2nd branch had to be closed to shipping until the end of the war – apart from very brief interruptions. The damage caused to the culvert during the attack from 3 to 4 March 1945 was so extensive that shipping traffic had to be suspended until well after the end of the war.

As part of Operation Plunder, the 1st Canadian Parachute Battalion captured Ladbergen from Greven on 1 April 1945. There were no further attacks on Ladbergen or the canal thereafter.

Besides bombs and downed airplanes shrapnel fell onto Ladbergen during the air raids causing loses in lives and property. Although the town was not the intended target, the air raids in 1944 and 1945 resulted in 28 civilian fatalities in Ladbergen, 52 in Leeden and 1 in Nordhorn. During the air raids from 1943 to 1945, 193 Australian, British, Irish, Canadian, New Zealand and South African crew members of crashed Lancaster bombers died immediately; 3 died later from their injuries and 15 are missing.

A report by the Minister of Armaments, Albert Speer, to Adolf Hitler dated 11 November 1944, which was captured at the end of the war, states: ‘The air raids on the Dortmund-Ems Canal and the railway network inflicted more serious setbacks on the German war industry at that time than any other type of bombardment.’

The first repair works on the Dortmund-Ems Canal at Ladbergen following the World War II began in July 1945. A British engineering unit, the 935th Port Construction and Repair Company, Royal Engineers, took charge of part of the construction project. In February/March 1946, the canal was refilled and navigation resumed.

In September 1949 Ladbergen regained its political autonomy. In January 1975 Ladbergen was transferred from the then dissolved district of Tecklenburg into the newly founded district of Steinfurt.

=== Noticeable facts ===
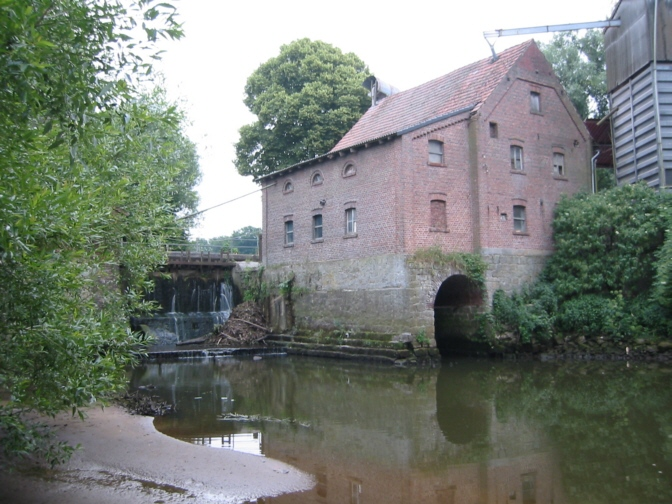
A watermill besides the Mühlenbach.

- About 37% of the population of the village emigrated during the 19th century. This was the highest emigration rate in Germany during that era.
- Peasants from Ladbergen often gained extra income by working in the Netherlands for extended periods.
- Many families from Ladbergen have family names, which in the recent past only existed in Ladbergen – such as Gehde, Rahmeier, Schoppenhorst, Wibbeler, Wiethaupt and Wiethölter.
- The predominant spoken language in Ladbergen was up to the 1930s almost exclusively Ladbergen Platt, a variant of the established Low German dialects. A 2009 survey concluded that just over 700 of the original inhabitants (11% of the population) still can speak this local dialect, though actively speaking the dialect is mostly reserved to the over-70-year-olds.
- Since the founding of the Federal Republic of Germany in the year 1949, Ladbergen is one of the "strongholds" of the Free Democratic Party in the Münsterland and throughout Germany.

== Economy ==
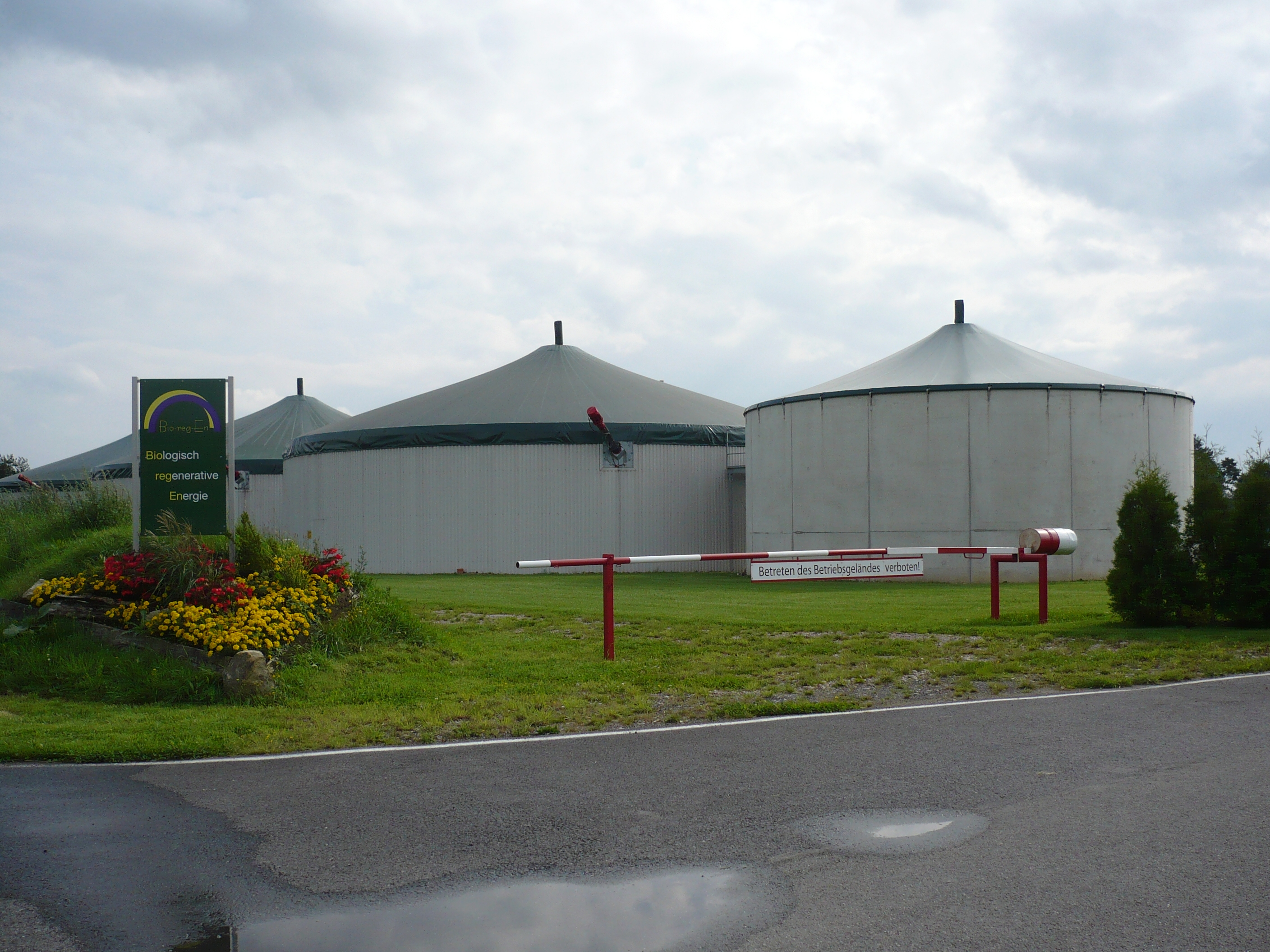
Anaerobic digestion plant at the Telgter Damm.

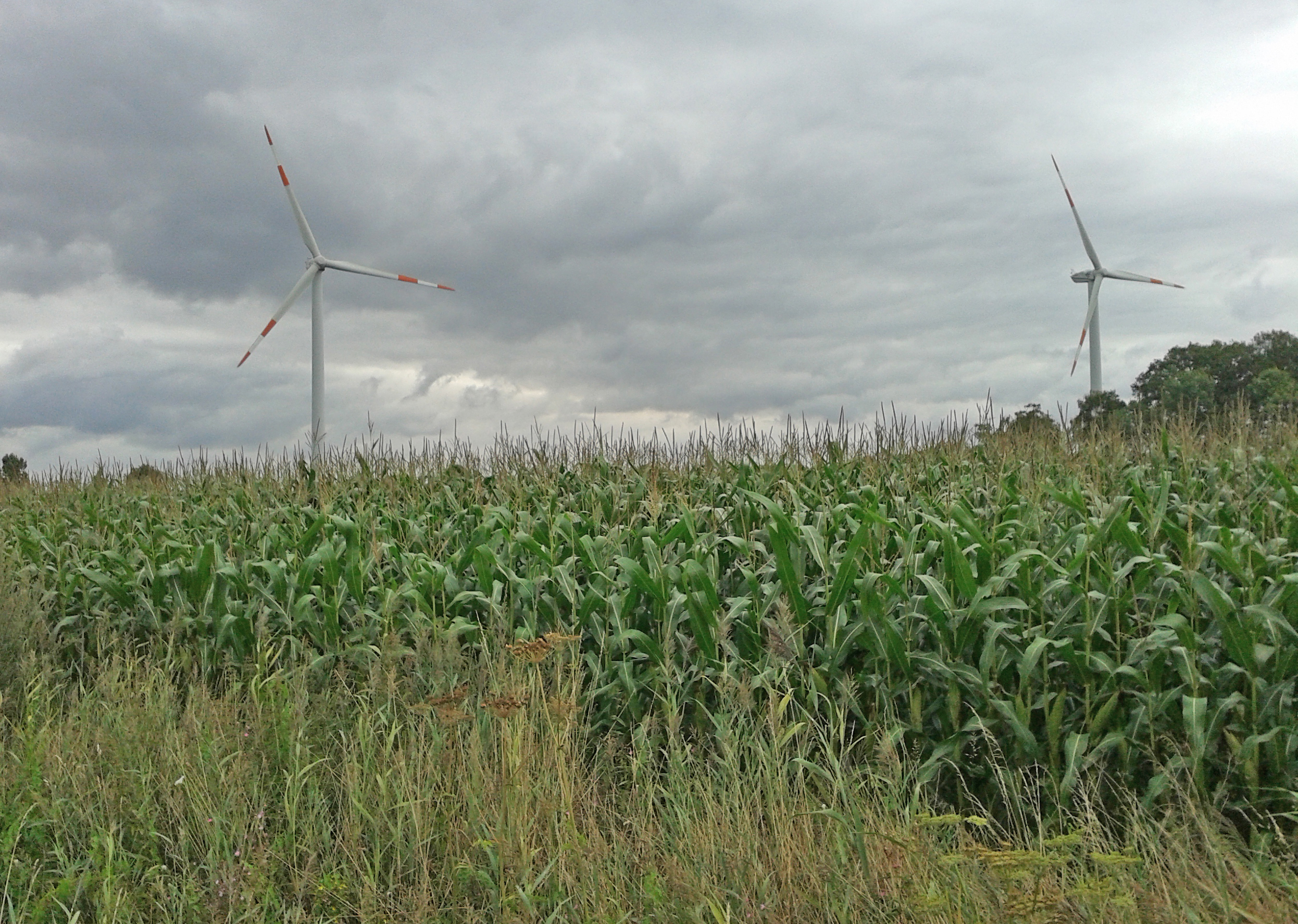
REpower MM82 wind turbines near the Münsterweg.

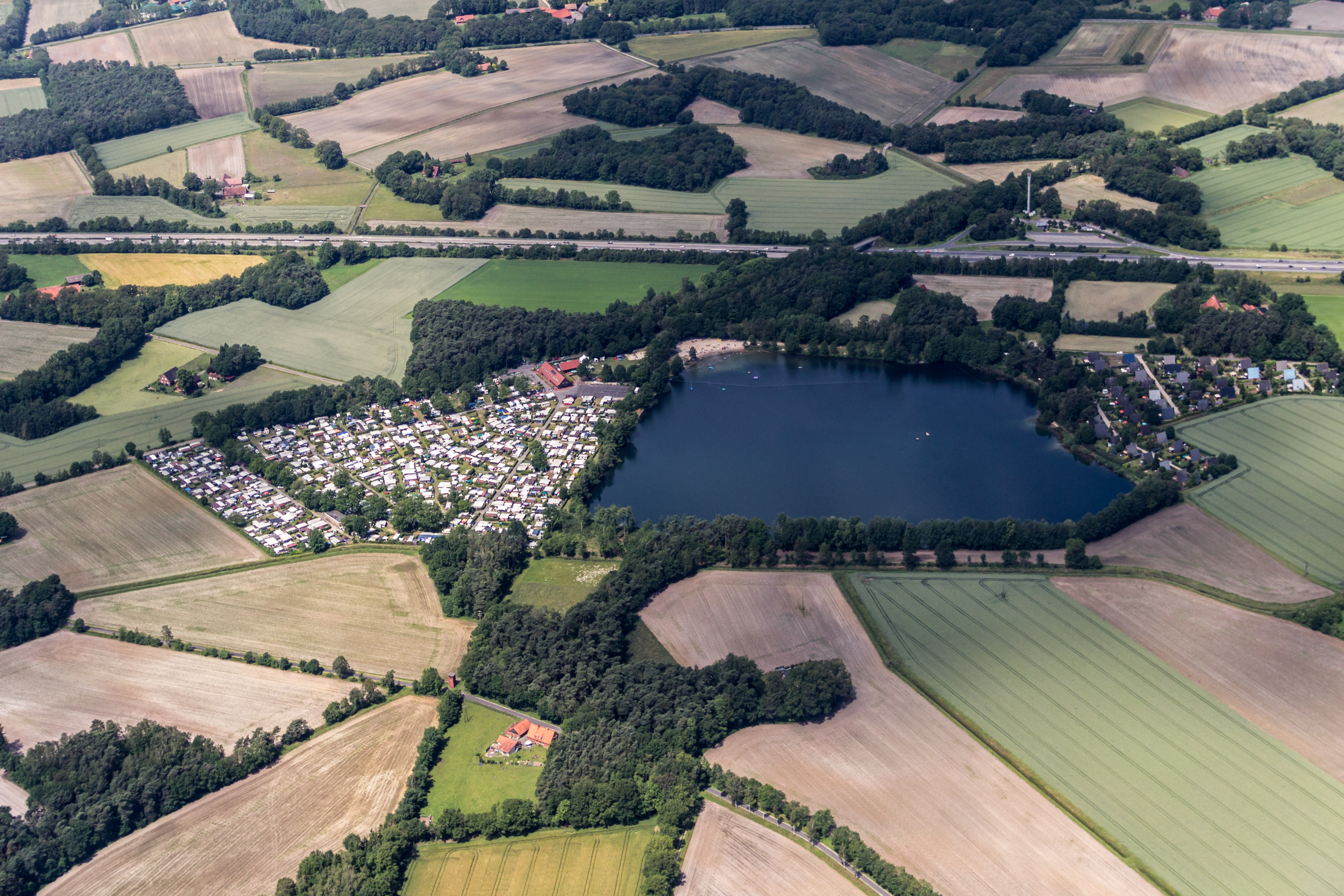
Camping facilities at the Buddenkuhle.

For centuries the economy of Ladbergen was based on agriculture. The introduction of fertilizer in the 20th century enabled the local peasants – who up to that moment had to deal with infertile sandy soil that yielded modest harvests – to escape from poverty. The infrastructural improvements and urbanization of the village after World War II and the West German Wirtschaftswunder created new jobs in trade, industry, transport, tourism and the service sector and commuters settled in Ladbergen. These developments diversified and boosted the economic development of Ladbergen. The last decades the municipality itself also profited from the establishment of new successful businesses and companies in Ladbergen and general prosperity amongst its citizens, by a steady increase in local taxes revenues. This enabled the municipality to invest in the local infrastructure, education and (social) services for its citizens.

=== Energy supply ===
In 2005 a wind farm consisting of three REpower MM82 wind turbines was erected on the outskirts of Ladbergen. Each of these MM82 wind turbines has an 80.0 m (262.5 ft) hub height and 82.0 m (269.0 ft) rotor diameter giving a total sweep of 5,281 m^{2} (56,844 sq ft) and an average power capacity of 2.050 kW. The power output is controlled by varying the pitch of the rotor blades which can operate at 8.5–17.1 rpm rotor speed. Together with the two anaerobic digestion plants that went into operation in 2006, the community - mathematically - can fulfill its energy needs. Another quite large power plant producing annually 50 million kWh electricity and 60 million kWh/216 million MJ of heat and process steam from renewable raw materials built by ME Münsterland Energy GmbH went into production in 2007. This wood pallets-fired combined heat and power gasification plant and accompanying district heating station at the Ladbergen canal harbor on the site of the old oil mill produces electric power for about 15,000 households, a multiple of the Ladbergen household's electric energy needs. The thermal power generated in the cogeneration process is used to supply industrial customers near the power plant location itself and also for residents in the nearby Airport Park of Münster-Osnabrück Airport.

== Local government ==
=== Town council ===
The most recent Gemeinderat (town council) election of Ladbergen was conducted on 13 September 2020. The town council is elected directly by the EU citizens living in the municipality and currently consists of 22 seats divided between several political parties. These political parties are also represented in the Bundestag (the German national parliament) in Berlin.

==== Election results ====
German town council members are elected for a 5-year term and regular elections are held every five years.

Town council of Ladbergen elections	1994	1999	2004	2009	2014	2020
Political party	Seats / %	Seats / %	Seats / %	Seats / %	Seats / %	Seats / %
Christian Democratic Union of Germany (CDU)	9 / 41.0%	8 / 37.6%	8 / 35.9%	7 / 33.1%	8 / 37.6%	8 / 36.7%
Social Democratic Party of Germany (SPD)	8 / 37.5%	8 / 35.6%	6 / 28.5%	7 / 29.6%	7 / 33.3%	7 / 33.5%
Free Democratic Party (FDP)	1 / 8.3%	4 / 16.3%	5 / 22.4%	5 / 17,7%	3 / 13.1%	2 / 9.7%
Alliance 90/The Greens (Bündnis 90/Die Grünen)	3 / 13.2%	2 / 10.5%	3 / 13.2%	3 / 13.6%	4 / 16.0%	7 / 20.1%
Total	21 / 100%	22 / 100%	22 / 100%	22 / 100%	22 / 100%	22 / 100%

The next scheduled town council election is to be held on the 14th September 2025.

=== Mayor ===
The Bürgermeister (mayor) of Ladbergen is since 1999 elected directly by the EU citizens living in the municipality. The mayor is elected for a 5-year term and regular elections are held every five years. The post may be said to be a professional one, the mayor being the head of the local government, and requiring, in order to be eligible, a training in administration.

The most recent election for mayor was conducted on 13 September 2020. Out of two candidates the independent candidate Torsten Buller was elected as mayor of Ladbergen.

==== Mayors of Ladbergen ====
- Wolfgang Menebröcker (independent) 1999–2009
- Udo Decker-König (independent) 2009–2020
- Torsten Buller (independent) 2020–incumbent

== Coat of arms ==
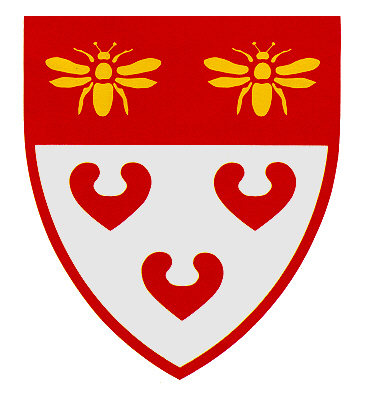
Coat of Arms of Ladbergen.

Blazon: Under a red shield top with two golden bees, in silver field three (2 : 1) red nymphaea leaves.

The bees refer to beekeeping. On the heath and moorland of Ladbergen beekeeping was widespread for centuries. According to a historic certificate honey farmers from Ladbergen had to pay taxes to the monastery Freckenhorst in the year 950.

The three Nymphaea or water lilies come from the seal of the Lord of Ladbergen from the year 1324. The water lilies symbol originates from the Duchy Lingen, to which Ladbergen belonged during a medieval period. The leaf shape has its origin in the coat of arms of the Counts of Tecklenburg.

== Sister village ==
- New Knoxville, Ohio, United States

A lot of emigrants originating from Ladbergen settled down in the area around New Knoxville in the state of Ohio in the United States with which Ladbergen established a town partnership. New Knoxville is partly composed of the descendants of the Ladbergen emigrants. The typical Ladbergen Platt dialect is still spoken by some of the older citizens whose ancestors originated from Ladbergen.

Due to the interest of American descendants of emigrants from Ladbergen in their family genealogy, more or less reliable private genealogical work was conducted after World War II. As Neil Armstrong, whose great-grandfather Friedrich Wilhelm Kötter emigrated from Ladbergen to the United States in 1864, was the first man to walk on the Moon in 1969, many citizens of Ladbergen became interested in their American "relatives". This resulted in a very close connection between Ladbergen and New Knoxville, which is especially cultivated by reciprocal visits. For the New Knoxville sesquicentennial in 1986, approximately 100 Ladbergen residents traveled to New Knoxville to join in the celebration.

Ladbergen's neighboring municipalities, Lengerich and Lienen, are sister cities with New Knoxville's neighbors Wapakoneta and Saint Marys, respectively.
