= Ostbevern =

- Municipality
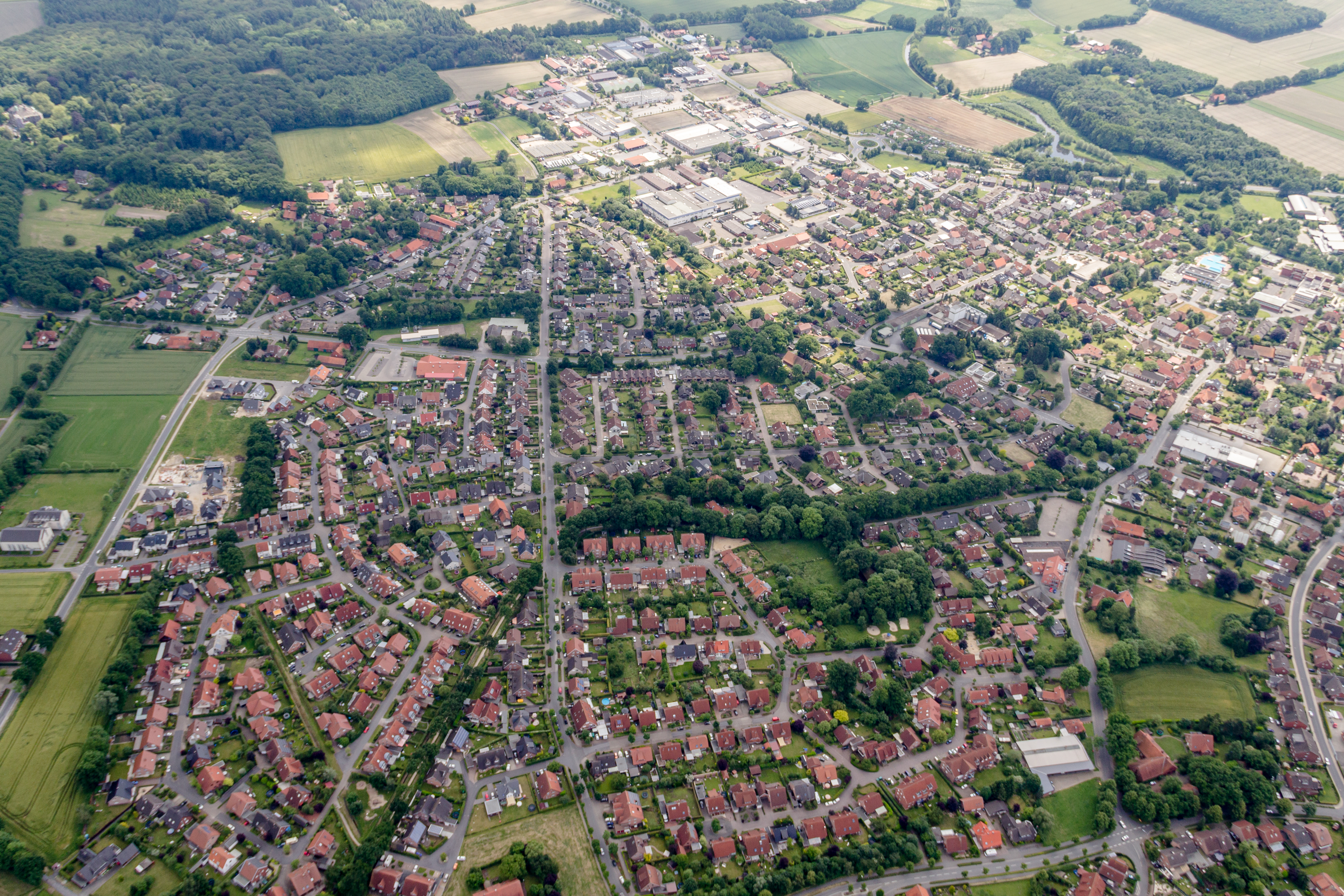

- Flag Coat of arms

- Location of Ostbevern within Warendorf district
- Interactive map of Ostbevern
- Location within Germany Location within North Rhine-Westphalia
- Coordinates: 52°2′20″N 7°50′45″E
- Country: Germany
- State: North Rhine-Westphalia
- Admin. region: Münster
- District: Warendorf
- Subdivisions: 2

Government
  - Mayor (2020–25): Karl Piochowiak (Ind.)

Area
  - Total: 89.65 km^{2} (34.61 sq mi)
- Elevation: 54 m (177 ft)

Population (2025-12-31)
  - Total: 11,385
  - Density: 127.0/km^{2} (328.9/sq mi)
- Time zone: UTC+01:00 (CET)
  - Summer (DST): UTC+02:00 (CEST)
- Postal codes: 48346
- Dialling codes: 02532
- Vehicle registration: WAF, BE
- Website: www.ostbevern.de

Ostbevern (German pronunciation: [ˈɔstˌbeːvɐn], lit. 'East Bevern', in contrast to "West Bevern"; Low German: Austbiäwern) is a municipality in the district of Warendorf, in North Rhine-Westphalia, Germany.

== Geography ==
Ostbevern is situated on the river Bever, approx. 18 km north-east of Münster and 18 km north-west of Warendorf.

=== Neighbouring municipalities ===
Ostbevern borders Ladbergen, Lienen, Glandorf (in Lower Saxony), Warendorf, Telgte, and Greven.

=== Division of the town ===
The municipality Ostbevern consists of the village Ostbevern, the district Brock and the surrounding farming land.

== History ==
In 1088 Bevern was first mentioned in an official document under the name Beverne. Presumably in the 12th century the parish Bevern was split into Ostbevern and Westbevern (which is now part of Telgte).

During the Napoleonic Wars the municipality first fell to Prussia, then to Berg. Since 1810, it then belonged to the French Empire, until Ostbevern was assigned to prussia again at the Congress of Vienna. Since World War II Ostbevern lies in North Rhine-Westphalia.

== Population ==
Historical population

Year	Pop.	±% p.a.
1965	5,736	—
1970	6,203	+1.58%
1975	6,613	+1.29%
1980	6,760	+0.44%
1985	6,840	+0.24%
1990	7,341	+1.42%
1995	8,686	+3.42%

Year	Pop.	±% p.a.
2000	9,935	+2.72%
2005	10,660	+1.42%
2010	10,569	−0.17%
2015	10,873	+0.57%
2020	11,116	+0.44%
2025	11,385	+0.48%

Source: Landesdatabank Nordrhein-Westfalen

== Politics ==
=== Communal Politics ===
After the local elections of 2014, the 26 seats of the municipal council are distributed like this:

- CDU: 13 seats
- FDP: 4 seats
- SPD: 5 seats
- Green Party: 4 seats

=== Twin Towns ===
Ostbeverns twins the city Loburg in Saxony-Anhalt.

== Economy ==
The economy in Ostbevern is characterized by agriculture and processing business. The FRIWO Group has its headquarters in Ostbevern.

== Tourist attractions ==
The Ambrose-church consist of a big new part, built in 1962 a smaller gothic church built in the 16th century. Parts of the church steeple are from the 12th century.

Another sight is the moated castle Loburg, in which there is today an episcopal school.

== People ==
- Joseph Annegarn (1794-1843), catholic theologian and writer
- Herman Koeckemann (1828-1892), catholic vicar apostolic of the Vicariate Apostolic of the Sandwich Islands
- Wolfgang Riesinger (born 1951), long-distance runner
