= Eltingmühlenbach =

River in Germany

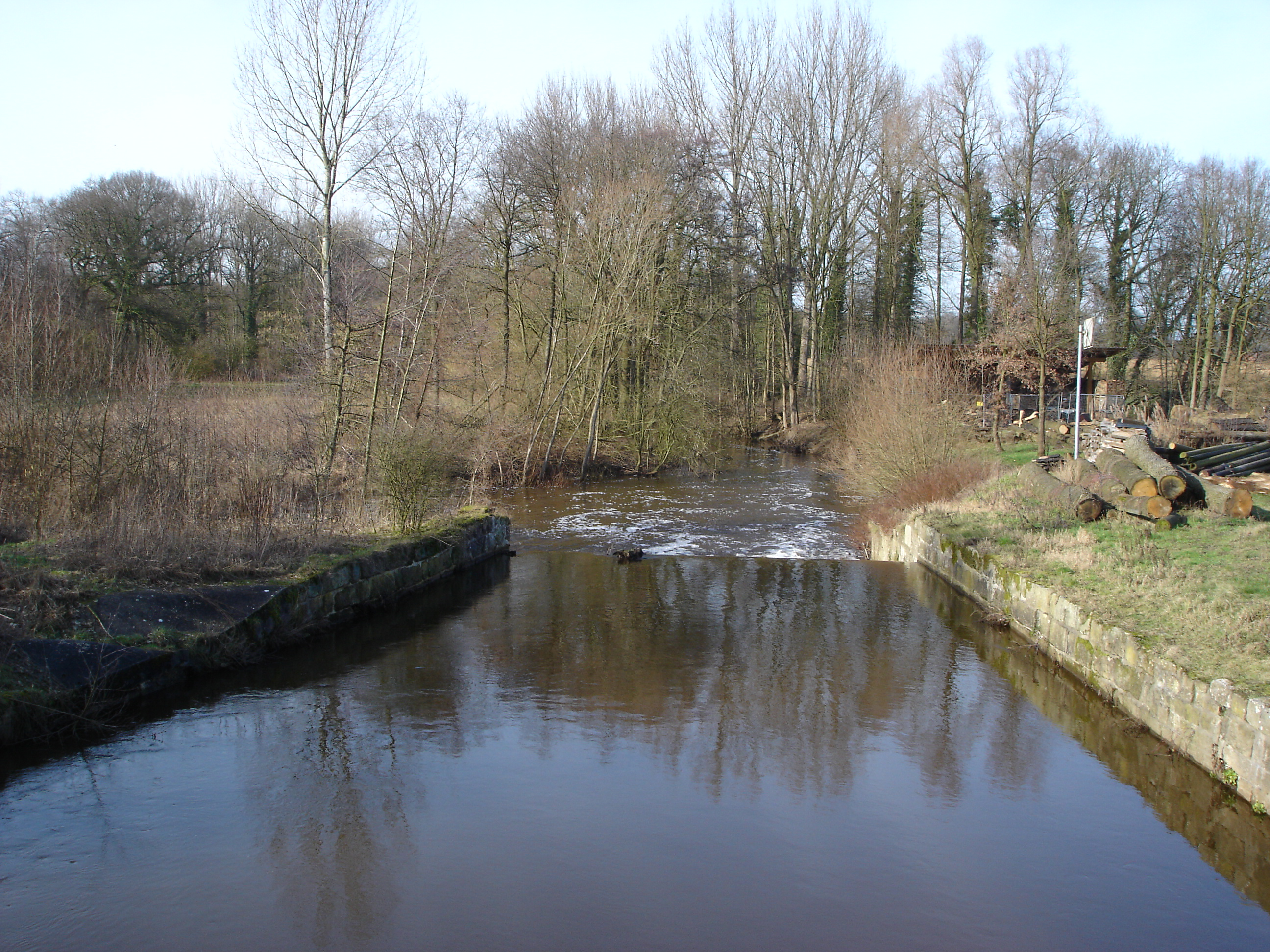

Location
- Country: Germany
- States: Lower Saxony and North Rhine-Westphalia

Physical characteristics
- Mouth
  - location: Glane
  - coordinates: 52.1394°N 7.6571°E
- Length: 51.3 km (31.9 mi)
- Basin size: 166 km^{2} (64 sq mi)

Basin features
- Progression: Glane→ Ems→ North Sea

Eltingmühlenbach is a river of Lower Saxony and North Rhine-Westphalia, Germany. It flows into the Glane near Greven. On its course from near Bad Iburg to the southwest, it assumes several names: Glaner Bach, Oedingberger Bach and Aa.

== See also ==
- List of rivers of Lower Saxony
- List of rivers of North Rhine-Westphalia
