= Glane (Ems) =

River in Germany

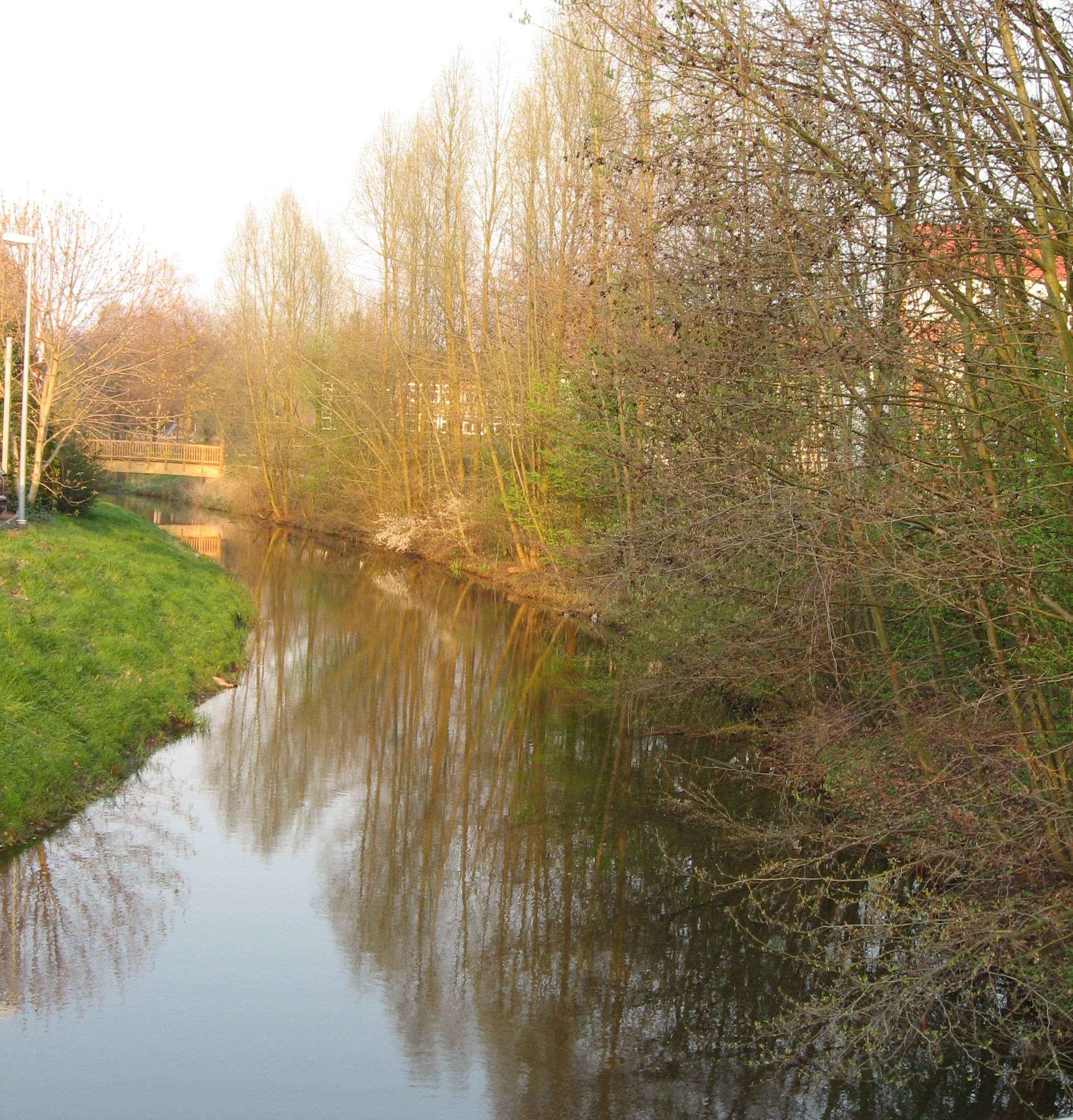

Location
- Country: Germany
- State: North Rhine-Westphalia

Physical characteristics
- Mouth
  - location: Ems
  - coordinates: 52.1519°N 7.6296°E
- Length: 35.1 km (21.8 mi)
- Basin size: 354 km^{2} (137 sq mi)

Basin features
- Progression: Ems→ North Sea
- Tributaries
  - left: Eltingmühlenbach

Glane is a river of North Rhine-Westphalia, Germany. It flows into the Ems near Saerbeck. On its course from near Lienen to the west, it assumes several names: Brookbieke, Lienener Mühlenbach and Ladberger Mühlenbach.

== See also ==
- List of rivers of North Rhine-Westphalia
