= William Shi-Yuan Wang =

Chinese linguist (born 1933)

- 王士元
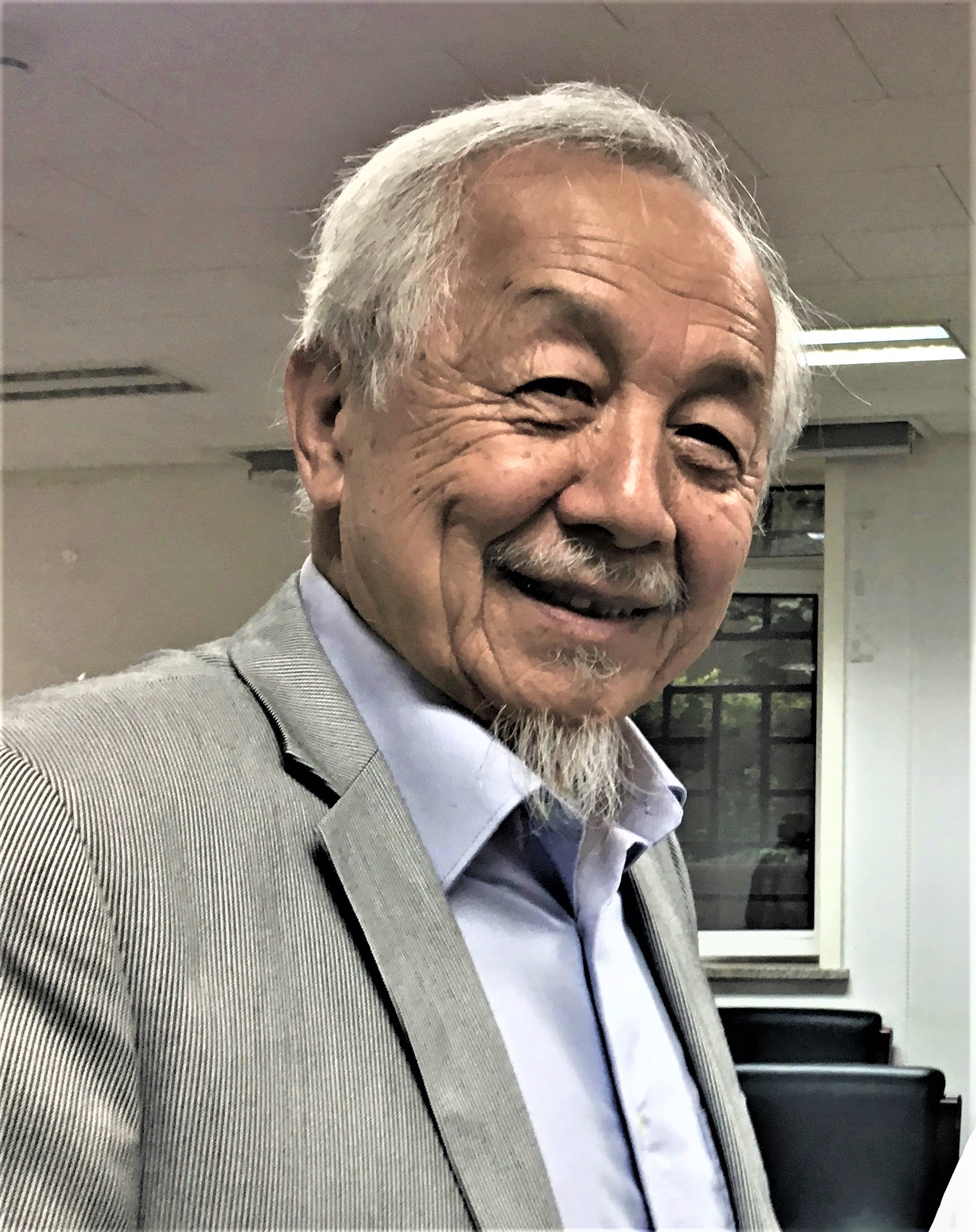
- Wang at Peking University, 2018
- Born: August 14, 1933 (age 93); Shanghai, China
- Known for: Contributions to lexical diffusion and Chinese linguistics
- Awards: Guggenheim Fellowship (1978-1979); Center for Advanced Study in the Behavioral Sciences, Stanford University, Fellowship (1969-70); Senior Fulbright Fellow and National Professor of Sweden (Stockholm, Umea, Upsala, and Lund) (1971-1972); Center for Advanced Study in the Behavioral Sciences, Stanford University, Fellowship (1983-84); Rockefeller Foundation Center for Advanced Studies, Resident Fellowship, Italy (1991); National Taiwan University of Science and Technology Golden Language Award (2010); University of Chicago Honorary Degree of Doctor of Humane Letters (June 9, 2018)

Academic background
- Education: Columbia University (BA), University of Michigan (MA, PhD)
- Thesis: Phonemic Theory A (with Application To Midwestern English) (1960)
- Doctoral advisor: Gordon E. Peterson

Academic work
- Discipline: Linguistics; Chinese languages; historical linguistics; language evolution; cognitive science
- Institutions: Hong Kong Polytechnic University (2015–present); Chinese University of Hong Kong (2004–2015); City University of Hong Kong (1995–2004); University of California, Berkeley (1966–2000); Ohio State University (1961–1966); I.B.M. Research Center at Yorktown Heights (1961); Massachusetts Institute of Technology (1960)

William Shi-Yuan Wang (Chinese: 王士元; pinyin: Wáng Shìyuán; born August 14, 1933) is a Chinese linguist, with expertise in phonology, the history of Chinese language and culture, historical linguistics, and the evolution of language in humans. He is Chair Professor at the Hong Kong Polytechnic University and National Taiwan Normal University, Emeritus Professor of the University of California, Berkeley, and Academician of Academia Sinica.

== Early life ==
William Shi-Yuan Wang was born in 1933 in Shanghai, China, and spent his preschool years in Anhui. His early schooling was in Shanghai.

== Education ==
Wang attended Columbia College in New York City on a scholarship (1951-1955) earning a BA in Liberal Arts. He pursued graduate work in Linguistics at the University of Michigan, where he received his MA in 1956, and his PhD in 1960, working with Gordon E. Peterson. His dissertation was entitled Phonemic Theory A (with Application To Midwestern English).

== Academic career ==
=== Sinitic languages ===
Wang has made contributions to the genetic classification of Sinitic languages and their typological peculiarities, including the study of its tones. He has published on Chinese phonology, tones, syntax, as well as overviews of Chinese languages, and tone languages generally.

In addition to his research contributions, he was elected as the first president of the International Association of Chinese Linguistics (founded in 1992). He co-edited the Oxford Handbook of Chinese Linguistics with Chaofen Sun in 2015. He is credited with founding the Department of East Asian languages in addition to the Department of Linguistics at Ohio State University.

==== Journal of Chinese Linguistics ====
Wang founded the Journal of Chinese Linguistics (Chinese: 中国语言学报; ISSN 0091-3723) in 1973. He has edited the journal since its foundation. He is currently Honorary Editor. The journal has published peer-reviewed articles covering many aspects of the Chinese language, including its phonetics, phonology, morphology, syntax, grammar, semantics, pragmatics, and Chinese writing systems. It has also published papers on historical linguistics, comparative linguistics, computational linguistics, psycholinguistics, neurolinguistics, evolutionary linguistics, sociolinguistics, applied linguistics, languages in contact, language change, language families. The Journal also publishes a monograph series.

==== Database of Chinese dialects ====
In 1966, Wang created the first electronic database of Chinese dialects, known as the Dictionary on Computer (DOC). DOC started as a basic corpus of 2,444 morphemes, each corresponding to a single Chinese logograph (ideograph). Each of these was referenced by a unique four-digit number assigned by the telegraphic service in China. The pronunciation(s) for each morpheme was given in each of 23 Chinese dialects or sources spanning 14 centuries, totaling 58,012 entries. It has since been expanded to include materials from important Middle and Modern Chinese dictionaries and rhyme books, as well as pronunciations of Sino-Japanese, Sino-Korean and different Chinese dialects. This database formed the basis for several studies of language change, including: 1) the first quantitative study of reflexes of the syllable initials in sixth-century Chinese, a study of the historical processes of nasalization and denasalization.

=== Lexical diffusion ===
The Dictionary on Computer formed the basis for Wang's theory of language change known as lexical diffusion. An important early paper outlining this theory was "Competing Changes as a Cause of Residue" published in the journal Language. In an article titled “Tone change in Chaozhou Chinese: A study in lexical diffusion,” he disputed the Neogrammarian assumption of “sound laws” in the ways that the phonetic inventories of languages evolve, with the changes putatively applying swiftly and across the board to classes of sounds. Consistent with his later position that grammars leak, he pointed out exceptions to sound classes in the spread of changes. He argued that sound changes affect one word at a time, spreading gradually to other lexical items that have the same sounds (in similar phonological environment) when they get to be used, subject to the usage frequencies of the lexical items in which they occur and the analogies established by speakers. Words that are less frequently used or joined the lexicon at a different times may not undergo the change. He has refined his position in several other papers. As a measure of the importance of this idea, a search for "lexical diffusion" on scholar.google.com on February 24, 2021, yielded over 5,380 results.

=== General perspective on language ===
Wang has long believed there has been an excessive emphasis in Linguistics on strict formalisms. He has credited the linguist Joseph Greenberg with being an important influence in this regard. In an interview in 2010, he stated that he met informally many times with Joseph Greenberg when both were in the Bay Area in California (Greenberg at Stanford University and Wang at the University of California, Berkeley). Wang related Greenberg's response to being shown a formal pattern of tone sandhi changes that Wang had discovered in Min Chinese dialects:

He says “you’ve shown me a clever trick with a formalism, what do I learn about the nature of language, what do I learn about the nature of Min with this clever trick?” and I went home frustrated, and thought and thought and thought, and I realized how extremely right he was. How excessive abstraction, excessive formalism, removing us from the empirical foundations of language is leading linguistics down the wrong track.

=== Evolution of language ===
Wang is one of the pioneers in modeling language emergence, evolution, and vitality. Early summaries of his views on language change and evolution were published in 1976: "Language change", 1978: "The three scales of diachrony" and 1982: "Explorations in language evolution." In 1984 he published a commentary critiquing Bickerton's "Language Bioprogram Hypothesis" target article in the journal Behavioral and Brain Sciences, arguing against the Chomskian perspective that language was largely independent of other aspects of cognition:

[...] the fact that language involves biological equipment does not necessarily lead to the "highly modular task-specific cognitive devices" and "equally modular and task-specific processing component" that Bickerton advocates. A piece of equipment may be involved in a certain task, but it may be used for other tasks as well, without being specific to any particular one of them. The devices used in language are surely involved in the more global (and evolutionarily prior) tasks of cognition, memory, and perception. Our goal is to elucidate how these general purpose devices interact with the specific requirements of learning and using language. To posit anything specific to language, in the sense that it serves no other non- linguistic function, seems to me not called for at this point.

In 1996, Wang co-authored another commentary in Behavioral and Brain Sciences arguing that syntax was not likely an independent cognitive module:

The belief that syntax is an innate, autonomous, species-specific module is highly questionable. Syntax demonstrates the mosaic nature of evolutionary change, in that it made use of (and led to the enhancement of) numerous preexisting neurocognitive features. It is best understood as an emergent characteristic of the explosion of semantic complexity that occurred during hominid evolution.

Wang guest-edited a special issue on language evolution in 1991 in Scientific American. He and his students/collaborators have published their work of modeling language change and evolution in venues such as Trends in Ecology and Evolution (2005), Transactions of the Philological Society (2005), Language and Linguistics (2005), Lingua (2008), in addition to various other Chinese language journals. He has also recognized the value of computational explorations of language evolution. A lecture given by Wang in Singapore in March 2014 titled "Language Evolution & Some Phase Transitions," which discusses his recent views on language evolution is available on YouTube.

Wang has also collaborated with scholars outside linguistics, including John Holland, who was best known for his work on complex systems approaches and pioneering the use of genetic algorithms and learning classifier systems in computational simulations. In 2005, both Wang and Holland were co-authors with several others on a paper exploring computational simulations of the evolution of the lexicon and syntax. Wang also collaborated with Luigi Luca Cavalli-Sforza, the geneticist who, among other things, pioneered the study of the extent to which findings in genetic linguistics are consistent with current hypotheses in genetics regarding the dispersal of the human species around the world since the exodus out of Africa. In 1986 Wang and Cavalli-Sforza co-authored a paper showing a strong correlation between geographic distance and lexical difference among Micronesian languages.

Wang collaborated with several geneticists on a study of Y-chromosome DNA variation as a means to infer population history of East Asia. Wang was co-author on a paper on brain structure/function with the biochemist and anthropologist, Vincent Sarich, who was a pioneer in molecular evolution. He has also collaborated with the anthropologist P. Thomas Schoenemann on topics related to language evolution. Wang collaborated with the statistician David Freedman, showing that polygenesis of language (the idea that languages originated many times independently) was actually statistically more likely than monogenesis.

==== International Conference in Evolutionary Linguistics ====
In 2009, Wang started the International Conference in Evolutionary Linguistics, or CIEL, which has been held every year since then, first in Guangzhou, then in Tianjin, Shanghai, Beijing, Hong Kong, Xiamen, Kunming, Nanjing, Bloomington, Indiana, and Shanghai (again). Summaries of each of these have been published in the Journal of Chinese Linguistics each year.

=== Language complexity ===
Wang has emphasized bridging evolutionary linguistics with evolutionary biology, as well as connecting research on linguistic complexity to complexity in cybernetics, directing attention to interactions of subsystems or modules within a language. Unlike those of the Chomskian tradition, he has resisted reducing linguistic complexity to formal rules within the system. He is among the first to have conceived of languages as complex adaptive systems, with emergent patterns in constant state of flux and in search of equilibrium, a position that makes it easier to account for the actuation of the so-called “internally-motivated change.”. Wang and his students/collaborators have published their work not only in traditional linguistics venues but also in the journal Complexity (see above)

Wang is unusual among linguists in arguing that languages do not have the same level of complexity, just as different technologies are not all equally complex. At a workshop in Lyon, France in 2011 titled "Complexity in Language: Developmental and Evolutionary Perspectives," Wang argued that languages displaying lower levels of linguistic complexity are not less evolved or more primitive. The fact that Chinese/Mandarin is simpler with respect to derivational and inflectional morphemes does not thereby indicate it is somehow inferior as a language. Wang argued that linguists should try to understand the phenomenon of complexity itself, in light of modern research on the subject matter in other disciplines, especially cybernetics. This perspective was foreshadowed by the Danish linguist Otto Jespersen, who, unlike many students of language evolution, hypothesized in 1922 that reducing complexity in language actually represented progress.

=== Cognitive neuroscience of language ===
Wang has published research on a number of aspects of brain and language. A tachistoscopic study with Ovid Tzeng in 1984 attempted to tease apart hemispheric biases with respect to spatial vs. temporal processing, and concluded the left hemisphere appeared to be more sensitive to temporal processing, and the right more sensitive to spatial processing. Another study involved assessing the strength of associations between a variety of cognitive tasks - including several tapping linguistic functions specifically - with brain size and some basic brain subcomponents measured using structural MRI on a set of sibling pairs (to control for between-family environmental effects). In collaboration with Paul Kay and others he investigated the activation of language regions during color perception using functional MRI. He co-authored a functional MRI study exploring the neural bases of congenital amusia in tonal language speakers. He has also co-authored research using EEG event-related potentials to study the time course of context-dependent talker normalization in spoken word identification, and has also contributed to work investigating EEG delta, theta, beta, and gamma brain oscillations during different levels of auditory sentence processing. He has published on lateralized Stroop interference effects with Chinese characters using a reaction time paradigm. He helped found the Research Centre for Language, Cognition, and Neuroscience at the Hong Kong Polytechnic University in 2019.

=== Festschrifts ===
2004: The Joy of Linguistic Research. A Festschrift for Prof. William S-Y. Wang’s 70th Birthday. Co-edited by Shi Feng and Zhongwei Shen. Tianjin: Nankai University Press. (23 papers in English and Chinese, 271 pages)

2005: POLA Forever: Festschrift in Honor of Professor William S-Y. Wang on his 70th Birthday. Co-edited by D-A Ho and O. Tzeng. Language and Linguistics Monograph Series w3, Taiwan: Academia Sinica. (16 papers in English and Chinese, 319 pages)

2010: The Joy of Linguistic Research II. A Festschrift for Prof. William S-Y. Wang’s 75th Birthday. Co-edited by Pan Wuyun and Zhongwei Shen. Shanghai: Shanghai Education Press. (25 papers in English and Chinese, 419 pages)

2013: Eastward Flows the Great River: Festschrift in Honor of Professor William S-Y. WANG on his 80th Birthday. (2 volumes: One in Chinese, with 43 separate article chapters covering 739 pages, and the other in English, with 25 article chapters covering 513 pages)

2018: Wangmen Qiuxue Ji, A Festschrift for Prof. William S-Y. Wang’s 85th Birthday, Co-edited Zhongwei Shen, Kong Jiangping, and Wang Feng. Kunming: Yunnan University Press. (17 articles in English and Chinese, 237 pages)

== Awards ==
Wang will be awarded an honorary doctorate at the University of Macau on December 2, 2023. He was awarded an Honorary Degree of Doctor of Humane Letters from University of Chicago, June 9, 2018. He received Lifetime Achievement Award in Anthropology from Shanghai Society of Anthropology in 2017. He has been awarded two fellowships from the Center for Advanced Study in the Behavioral Sciences, Stanford University, in 1969-70 and again in 1983–84. From 1971 to 1972 he was a Senior Fulbright Fellow and National Professor of Sweden (Stockholm, Umea, Upsala, and Lund), and for 1978-9 was awarded a fellowship from the Guggenheim Foundation, New York, and concurrent Fulbright Travel Grant to Osmania University, India, as a Fulbright Senior Lecturer. He was awarded a resident fellowship at the Rockefeller Foundation Center for Advanced Studies at Bellagio, Italy, and a fellowship from the International Institute of Advanced Studies, in Kyoto, Japan. He was elected President of the International Association of Chinese Linguistics when it was founded in 1992 in Singapore. In 1992 he was named the 19th Academician of the Academia Sinica, in Taiwan, and served on the Advisory Committees of the Institute of Linguistics (as chairman) and of the Institute of Information Sciences. He is currently an Honorary Professor of many Chinese universities, including: Peking University 北京大学 (2010), Beijing Language and Culture University 北京语言大学 (2011), Nanjing Normal University 南京师范大学 (2014), Huaqiao University 华侨大学 (2017), Fudan University 复旦大学 (1994), and Nankai University 南开大学 (1996). In addition, he is a Chair Professor at National Taiwan Normal University. He has also been an Honorary Professor at Dalian Nationalities University ⼤连民族⼤学 (2012-2015), City University of Hong Kong (2017-2020), and Chinese University of Hong Kong (2015-2018). In 1996 he was Principal Investigator of a Chiang Ching-kuo Foundation grant to do research on the Yao languages of South China. In 2010 he was awarded the Golden Language Award from National Taiwan University of Science and Technology.
