= Linguistic monogenesis and polygenesis =

Hypotheses on the origin of languages

In historical or evolutionary linguistics, monogenesis and polygenesis are two different hypotheses about the phylogenetic origin of human languages. According to monogenesis, human language arose only once in a single community, and all current languages come from the first original tongue. On the other hand, according to polygenesis, human languages came into being in several communities independently, and current tongues derived from different sources.

== Monogenesis ==
The monogenetic theory posits a single origin of all of the world's oral languages. It states that all current languages have formed through language change from a single tongue that gradually differentiated into mutually unintelligible languages. The first scholar to publish this theory was Alfredo Trombetti, in the book L'Unità d'origine del linguaggio, published in 1905. More recently, Joseph Greenberg and Merritt Ruhlen, proponents of monogenesis, argue that in modern languages there is sufficient evidence to reconstruct part of the original language (called Proto-World or Proto-Sapiens). However, this claim has been highly controversial and the reconstructions made by Ruhlen are often discredited by mainstream linguists.

Some studies seem to correlate genetic and phonemic diversity, but this approach has been criticized thoroughly.

Some proponents of monogenesis are Alfredo Trombetti, Joseph Greenberg, Harold C. Fleming, Merritt Ruhlen and John Bengtson.

=== History ===
The first serious scientific attempt to establish monogenesis was that of Alfredo Trombetti, in his book L'unità d'origine del linguaggio, published in 1905. Trombetti estimated that the common ancestor of existing languages had been spoken between 100,000 and 200,000 years ago.

In the 1950s, Morris Swadesh was one of the most important supporters of monogenesis. He created two controversial methods based on previous ideas, namely lexicostatistics and glottochronology.

In the second half of the 20th century, Joseph Greenberg produced a series of controversial large-scale classifications of the world's languages. Although Greenberg did not produce an explicit argument for monogenesis, all of his classification work was geared toward this end. As he stated, "The ultimate goal is a comprehensive classification of what is very likely a single language family."

== Polygenesis ==
Polygenesis points to a multiple origin of human languages. According to this hypothesis, languages evolved as several lineages independent of one another. Modern investigation about creole languages demonstrated that with an appropriate linguistic input or pidgin, children develop a language with stable and defined grammar in one generation. Creole languages descend from pidgins. Another example is Nicaraguan Sign Language, created from isolated signs that did not form a set of stable rules, and thus did not then constitute an authentic language.

Polygenesis is not to be confused with the wave theory, originally propounded by Johannes Schmidt.

Some proponents of polygenesis are David A. Freedman, William Shi-Yuan Wang, Christophe Coupé, and Jean-Marie Hombert.

=== History ===
Two of the earliest supporters of polygenesis were August Schleicher and Ernst Haeckel. Their ideas of linguistic polygenesis were linked with polygenism: it stated that several language families arose independently from speechless proto-humans (original German: Urmenschen). According to Haeckel,

We must mention here one of the most important results of the comparative study of languages, which for the Stammbaum of the species of men is of the highest significance, namely that human languages probably had a multiple or polyphyletic origin. Human language as such probably developed only after the species of speechless Urmenschen or Affenmenschen (German: ape-men) had split into several species or kinds. With each of these human species, language developed on its own and independently of the others. At least this is the view of Schleicher, one of the foremost authorities on this subject. ... If one views the origin of the branches of language as the special and principal act of becoming human, and the species of humankind as distinguished according to their language stem, then one can say that the different species of men arose independently of one another.

Polygenesis was accepted by many linguists in the late 19th and early 20th century, when polygenism was popularized.

In the 1990s and 2000s, interest in polygenesis reappeared, with papers written by David A. Freedman, William S-Y. Wang, Cristophe Coupé, and Jean-Marie Hombert.

== Bibliography ==
- Greenberg, Joseph H. 1966. The Languages of Africa, revised edition. Bloomington: Indiana University Press. (Published simultaneously at The Hague by Mouton & Co.)
- Greenberg, Joseph H. 1971. "The Indo-Pacific hypothesis." Reprinted in Joseph H. Greenberg, Genetic Linguistics: Essays on Theory and Method, edited by William Croft, Oxford: Oxford University Press, 2005.
- Greenberg, Joseph H. 1987. Language in the Americas. Stanford: Stanford University Press.
- Greenberg, Joseph H. 2000–2002. Indo-European and Its Closest Relatives: The Eurasiatic Language Family. Volume 1: Grammar. Volume 2: Lexicon. Stanford: Stanford University Press.
- Ruhlen, Merritt. 1994. On the Origin of Languages: Studies in Linguistic Taxonomy. Stanford: Stanford University Press.
- Trombetti, Alfredo. 1905. L'unità d'origine del linguaggio. Bologna: Luigi Beltrami.
- Trombetti, Alfredo. 1922–1923. Elementi di glottologia, 2 volumes. Bologna: Zanichelli.

== See also ==
- Monogenetic theory of pidgins
- Proto-human language
- Monogenism
- Polygenism
- August Schleicher
- Ernst Haeckel
- The Tower of Babel
