= Merritt Ruhlen =

American linguist (1944–2021)

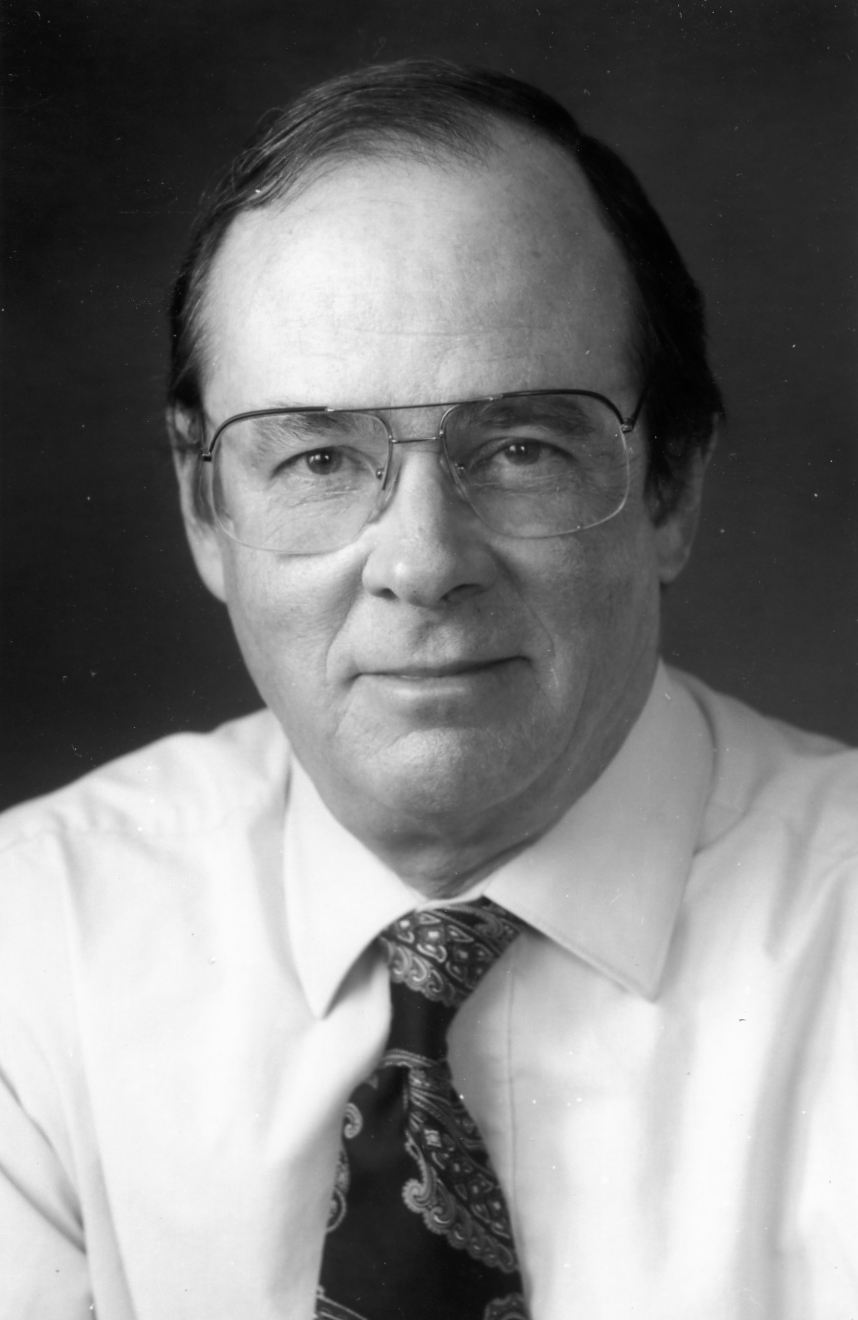
- Born: May 10, 1944; Washington, D.C., U.S.
- Died: January 29, 2021 (aged 76); Palo Alto, California, U.S.
- Known for: Genetic classification of languages
- Scientific career
- Fields: Linguistics

Merritt Ruhlen (May 10, 1944 – January 29, 2021) was an American linguist who worked on the classification of languages and what this reveals about the origin and evolution of modern humans. Amongst other linguists, Ruhlen's work was recognized as standing outside the mainstream of comparative-historical linguistics. He was the principal advocate and defender of Joseph Greenberg's approach to language classification.

== Biography ==
Born Frank Merritt Ruhlen, 1944, Ruhlen studied at Rice University, the University of Paris, the University of Illinois and the University of Bucharest. He received his PhD in 1973 from Stanford University with a dissertation on the generative analysis of Romanian morphology. Subsequently, Ruhlen worked for several years as a research assistant on the Stanford Universals Project, directed by Joseph Greenberg and Charles Ferguson.

From 1994, he was a lecturer in Anthropological Sciences and Human Biology at Stanford and co-director, along with Murray Gell-Mann (and, until 2005, the late Sergei Starostin), of the Santa Fe Institute Program on the Evolution of Human Languages. From 2005, Ruhlen was on the advisory board of the Genographic Project and held appointment as a visiting professor at the City University of Hong Kong. Ruhlen knew and worked with Joseph Greenberg for three-and-a-half decades and became the principal advocate and defender of Greenberg's controversial methods of language classification.

== Books ==
Ruhlen is the author of several books dealing with the languages of the world and their classifications.

- A Guide to the Languages of the World (1975) provides information on the phonological systems and classifications of 700 languages, prefaced by background information for linguists as well as non-linguists. A greatly expanded version of this work was published in 2005 on the Santa Fe Institute web site.
- A Guide to the World’s Languages, Volume I: Classification (1987) includes classification of the world's languages; a history and analysis of the genetic classification of languages; and a defense of the controversial taxonomic work of Joseph Greenberg.
- The Origin of Language: Tracing the Evolution of the Mother Tongue (1994a)
- On the Origin of Languages: Studies in Linguistic Taxonomy (1994b). In 1994, Ruhlen published these two books that have similar themes and titles, but are directed at different audiences. The former book, directed at laypersons, includes exercises in which the readers are invited to classify languages themselves using Greenberg's technique, known variously as "mass comparison" and "multilateral comparison". The latter book is aimed at linguists and maintains that some of the assumptions current among historical linguists are incorrect. One of these assumptions is that the only valid criteria for determining a language family are regular sound correspondences and the reconstruction of its protolanguage. According to Ruhlen, these steps can only be carried out after the fact of familyhood has been established by classification.

== Research topics ==
=== Multidisciplinary approach ===
Ruhlen has been in the forefront of attempts to coordinate the results of historical linguistics and other human sciences, such as genetics and archaeology. In this endeavor he has extensively worked with the geneticist Luigi Luca Cavalli-Sforza for three decades and with the archaeologist Colin Renfrew for two decades.

=== Taxonomic methods ===
Most of the criticism directed at Ruhlen centers on his defense of Joseph Greenberg's technique of language classification, called "mass comparison" or "multilateral comparison." It involves comparing selected elements of the morphology and basic vocabulary of the languages being investigated, examining them for similarities in sound and meaning, and formulating a hypothesis of classification based on these. Ruhlen maintains that such classification is the first step in the comparative method and that the other operations of historical linguistics, in particular the formulation of sound correspondences and the reconstruction of a protolanguage, can only be carried out after a hypothesis of classification has been established.

While Hock, for instance, claims that only reconstruction proves genetic affinity, and that Indo-European, Uralic, Dravidian, Austronesian, Bantu, and Uto-Aztecan have all been proved by successful reconstructions, Ruhlen disagrees, saying: And yet all of these families were universally accepted as valid families before anyone even thought of trying to reconstruct the protolanguage. As an example, Ruhlen mentions Delbrück (1842–1922), who considered Indo-European to have been proved by the time of Bopp at the beginning of the 19th century; the basis for this proof was the "juxtaposition of words and forms of similar meaning." However, Ruhlen's claim was refuted by Poser and Campbell.

Ruhlen believes his classification of the world's languages is supported by population genetics research by the geneticist Luigi Luca Cavalli-Sforza, who has identified the distribution of certain human genes in populations throughout the world. He has used this evidence to construct phylogenetic trees showing the evolutionary history of these populations. Cavalli-Sforza's findings are argued to match up remarkably well with Ruhlen's language classification. Ruhlen's linguist opponents hold that genetic relatedness cannot be used to adduce linguistic relatedness.

This tree has been criticized by some linguists and anthropologists on several grounds: that it makes selective use of languages and populations (omitting the numerous Sino-Tibetan speakers of northern China, for example); that it assumes the truth of such linguistic groups as Austric and Amerind that are controversial; and that several of the population groups listed are defined not by their genes but by their languages, making the correlation irrelevant to a comparison of genetic and linguistic branching and tautological as well.

=== Amerind macrofamily ===
The prevailing opinion on the classification of Western Hemisphere languages is that there are many separate language families in the Americas, among which concrete evidence for genetic affinity is lacking. Greenberg published his contrary hypothesis, Amerind language family, in 1987 in one of his major books, Language in the Americas. According to the Amerind hypothesis, all of the languages of North and South America, except for the Na-Dene and Eskimo–Aleut language families, belong to a single macrofamily. One of Greenberg's most controversial hypotheses, it was updated by Ruhlen in 2007. Ruhlen has published papers presenting research in support of it, e.g., in 1994, 1995, and 2004.

Ruhlen stresses the importance of the three-way i / u / a (i.e. masculine / feminine / neutral) ablaut in such forms as t'ina / t'una / t'ana ("son / daughter / child") as well as of the general American pronominal pattern na / ma (i.e. "I / you"), first noted by Alfredo Trombetti in 1905. Some linguists have attributed this pronoun pattern to other than genetic causes. He refers to the earliest beginnings of the dispute, quoting from a personal letter of Edward Sapir to A.L. Kroeber (1918): "Getting down to brass tacks, how in the Hell are you going to explain general American n- 'I' except genetically? It's disturbing, I know, but (more) non-committal conservatism is only dodging, after all, isn't it? Great simplifications are in store for us."

Greenberg and Ruhlen's views on the languages of the Americas have failed to find acceptance among the vast majority of linguists working with these languages.

=== Kusunda as an Indo-Pacific language ===
Whitehouse, Ruhlen, and others have concluded that the Kusunda language of Nepal belongs to the tentative Indo-Pacific superfamily rather than belonging to the Tibeto-Burman group or being a language isolate. They adduce:

- within the personal pronouns,
  - an independent first-person pronoun based on /t/;
  - an independent second-person pronoun based on /n/ or /ŋ/;
  - an independent third-person pronoun based on /g/ or /k/;
  - a vowel alternation in the first- and second-person independent pronouns in which /u/ occurs in subject forms and /i/ in possessive (or oblique) forms;
- a possessive suffix -/yi/;
- the consonantal base also indicates the verbal subject;
- demonstrative pronouns based on /t/ and /n/;
- the core vocabulary.

The following table shows similarities between the pronominal systems of several languages claimed to belong to the Indo-Pacific family.

Pronoun	Kusunda	Andamanese languages		Core North Halmaheran family	Central Bird's Head family
Pronoun	Kusunda	Juwoi	Bo	Galela	Karon Dori
I	tsi (< *ti)	tui	tu-lʌ	to	tuo
my	tsi-yi	tii-ye	ti-e	d͡ʒi "me"	
you	nu	ŋui	ŋu-lʌ	no	nuo
your	ni-yi	ŋii-ye		ni "thee"	
he/she	gina (cf. gida, git)	kitɛ		kitɛ	gao

The following objections have been made to this tentative proposal:

- the existence of an Indo-Pacific superfamily is disputed;
- pronouns can be borrowed;
- similarities may be due to chance;
- linguistic relationships cannot be adduced solely on the basis of the physical attributes of the speakers, and the current proposal concurs with an old one allegedly so based;
- misrepresentation of the data (e.g., kitɛ in Juwoi is actually a demonstrative meaning "this", never used as a personal pronoun.)

=== Yeniseian–Na-Dene ===
According to Ruhlen, linguistic evidence indicates that the Yeniseian languages, spoken in central Siberia, are most closely related to the Na-Dene languages of western North America (among which, concurring with Sapir, he includes Haida). The hypothesis is supported by the separate researches of Heinrich K. Werner and Edward J. Vajda (Vajda rejects Haida's membership in the Na-Dene language family). This would mean that Na-Dene represents a distinct migration of peoples from Asia to the New World, intermediate between the migration of speakers of the putative Proto-Amerind, estimated at 13,000 years ago, and the migration of Eskimo–Aleut speakers around 5,000 years ago. At other times, Ruhlen has maintained the existence of a language family called Dene–Caucasian.

=== The Proto-Sapiens hypothesis ===
On the question of the Proto-Sapiens language and global etymologies, most mainstream historical linguists reject Ruhlen's assumptions and methodology, holding that it is impossible to reconstruct a language spoken at least 30,000 years ago (possibly more than 100,000 years ago). Ruhlen has responded that he (and Bengtson) have never claimed to have reconstructed Proto-Sapiens, but have simply pointed out that reflexes of very ancient words can still be found in the world's languages: For each [global] etymology ... we present a phonetic and semantic gloss, followed by examples from different language families. ... We do not deal here with reconstruction, and these [semantic and phonetic] glosses are intended merely to characterize the most general meaning and phonological shape of each root. Future work on reconstruction will no doubt discover cases where the most widespread meaning or shape was not original.

Ruhlen also maintains that the “temporal ceiling” assumed by many mainstream linguists – the time depth beyond which the comparative method fails, considered by some to lie at roughly 6,000 to 8,000 years ago – does not exist, and that the now universally recognized existence of a language family as old as Afroasiatic, not to mention the even older Eurasiatic (whose existence remains controversial), shows that the comparative method can reach farther into the past than most linguists currently accept.

== Bibliography ==
- BATEMAN, Richard; GODDARD, Ives; O'GRADY, Richard; FUNK, V. A.; MOOI, Rich; KRESS, Joh; CANNELL, Peter (February 1990), "Speaking of Forked Tongues", Current Anthropology, 31 (1), The Wenner-Gren Foundation for Anthropological Research; The University of Chicago Press: 1–24, doi:10.1086/203800, S2CID 53702764
- BENGTSON, John D.; RUHLEN, Merritt (1994), "Global Etymologies" (PDF), in RUHLEN, Merritt (ed.), On the Origin of Languages: Studies in Linguistic Taxonomy, Stanford: Stanford University Press, pp. 277–336: p. 291 & note 3, ISBN 978-0-8047-2321-3
- CAMPBELL, Lyle (1997), American Indian languages: The historical linguistics of Native America, New York: Oxford University Press, ISBN 978-0-585-37161-0
- CAVALLI-SFORZA, Luigi Luca; PIAZZA, Alberto; MENOZZI, Paolo; MOUNTAIN, Joanna (1988), "Reconstruction of Human Evolution: Bringing Together Genetic, Archeological and Linguistic Data", PNAS, 85 (16), National Academy of Sciences: 6002–6006, Bibcode:1988PNAS...85.6002C, doi:10.1073/pnas.85.16.6002, ISSN 1091-6490, PMC 281893, PMID 3166138
- CAVALLI-SFORZA, Luigi Luca (2000), Genes, peoples, and languages, New York: North Point Press, ISBN 978-0-86547-529-8
- CHEN, Jiangtian; SOKAL, Robert R.; RUHLEN, Merritt (1995), "Worldwide Analysis of Genetic and Linguistic Relationships of Human Populations", Human Biology, 67 (4), Wayne State University Press: 595–612, ISSN 0018-7143, PMID 7649533
- DELBRÜCK, Berthold (1880), Einleitung in das Sprachstudium. Ein Beitrag zur Geschichte und Methodik der vergleichenden Sprachforschung, Leipzig: Breitkopf & Härtel, OCLC: 3961260
- GREENBERG, Joseph Harold (1971), Regional linguistic notebooks, Pacific languages, ca. 1969–1971, OCLC: 122369578
- GREENBERG, Joseph H.; RUHLEN, Merritt (September 4, 2007), An Amerind Etymological Dictionary (PDF), 12, Department of Anthropological Sciences, Stanford University, archived from the original (PDF) on October 19, 2013
- HOCK, Hans Heinrich (1986), Principles of Historical Linguistics, Berlin; New York: Mouton de Gruyter, ISBN 978-0-89925-220-9
- HOCK, Hans Heinrich; JOSEPH, B. D. (1996), Language history, language change, and language relationship: An introduction to historical and comparative linguistics, Berlin; New York: Mouton de Gruyter, ISBN 978-3-11-014785-8
- HODGSON, B. H. (1857), "Comparative vocabulary of the languages of the broken tribes of Népál", Journal of the Asiatic Society of Bengal, 26, Calcutta: Asiatic Society Bengal: 317–332, OCLC: 20216845
- KAUFMAN, Terrence (1990), "Language History in South America: What We Know and How to Know More", in PAYNE, D. L. (ed.), Amazonian Linguistics: Studies in Lowland South American Languages, Austin: University of Texas Press, pp. 13–73
- KESSLER, Brett (2001), The Significance of Word Lists: Statistical Tests for Investigating Historical Connections Between Languages, Stanford: CSLI Publications, University of Chicago Press, ISBN 978-1-57586-299-6
- KNIGHT, Alec; UNDERHILL, Peter A.; MORTENSEN, Holly M.; ZHIVOTOVSKY, Lev A.; LIN, Alice A.; HENN, Brenna M.; LOUIS, Dorothy; RUHLEN, Merritt; MOUNTAIN, Johanna L. (April 18, 2003), "African Y-chromosome and mtDNA Divergence Provides Insight into the History of Click Languages", Current Biology, 13 (6), Cell Press: 464–473, Bibcode:2003CBio...13..464K, doi:10.1016/S0960-9822(03)00130-1, PMID 12646128, S2CID 52862939
- Library of Congress Authorities, entry for Ruhlen, Merritt 1944–, accessed September 3, 2007
- NICHOLS, Johanna (1992), Linguistic diversity in space and time, Chicago: University of Chicago Press, ISBN 978-0-226-58056-2
- PICARD, Marc (1998), "The Case Against Global Etymologies: Evidence from Algonquian", International Journal of American Linguistics, 64 (2), New York: Douglas C. McMurtrie: 141–147, doi:10.1086/466353, ISSN 0020-7071, S2CID 143055930
- POSER, Bill (June 10, 2004). "Kusunda". Language Log (Mailing list).
- REINHARD, Johan (1976), Journal of the Institute of Nepal Asian Studies, 4, Tribhuvan University: 1–21
- REINHARD, Johan; TOBA, Tim (1970), A Preliminary Linguistic Analysis and Vocabulary of the Kusunda Language, Kirtipur: Summer Institute of Linguistics & Tribhuvan University, OCLC: 650443
- RUHLEN, Merritt (1975), A Guide to the Languages of the World, Stanford, OCLC: 1940981
- RUHLEN, Merritt (1987), A Guide to the World's Languages, Vol. 1: Classification, Stanford: Stanford University Press, ISBN 978-0-8047-1250-7
- RUHLEN, Merritt (1994a), The Origin of Language: Tracing the Evolution of the Mother Tongue, New York: John Wiley & Sons, ISBN 978-0-471-58426-1
- RUHLEN, Merritt (1994b), On the Origin of Languages: Studies in Linguistic Taxonomy, Stanford: Stanford University Press, ISBN 978-0-8047-2321-3
- RUHLEN, Merritt (1994c), "Evolution of Language", in MACEY, Sam (ed.), Encyclopedia of Time, New York: Garland Science, Bibcode:1994enti.book.....M, ISBN 978-0-8153-0615-3
- RUHLEN, Merritt (1994d), "Linguistic Evidence for the Peopling of the Americas", in BONNICHSEN, Robson; STEELE, D. Gentry (eds.), Method and Theory for Investigating the Peopling of the Americas, Corvallis, Oregon: Center for the Study of the First Americans, Oregon State University, ISBN 978-0-912933-09-2
- Ruhlen, Merritt. 1994e. Plus ça change, plus c'est la même chose. Mother Tongue (Newsletter of the Association for the Study of Language In Prehistory), November 1994, 23. OCLC: 35315526
- RUHLEN, Merritt (1994f), "Review of 'Linguistic Diversity in Space and Time' By Johanna NICHOLS", Anthropos, 89, Anthropos Institute: 640–641, ISSN 0257-9774
- Ruhlen, Merritt. 1995a. Proto-Amerind Numerals. Anthropological Science, January 1995, 103(3): 209–225. Tokyo: Anthropological Society of Nippon. ISSN 1348-8570
- Ruhlen, Merritt. 1995b. A Note on Amerind Pronouns. Mother Tongue (Newsletter of the Association for the Study of Language In Prehistory). March 1995, 24: 60–61. OCLC: 35315526
- Ruhlen, Merritt. 1995c. Proto-Amerind *QETS’ 'Left (Hand)'. Mother Tongue (Newsletter of the Association for the Study of Language In Prehistory). March 1995, 24: 69–70. OCLC: 35315526
- Ruhlen, Merritt. 1995d. On the Origin of the Amerind Pronominal Pattern. In Chen, Matthew Y.; Tzeng, Ovid J. L., eds, In honor of William S-Y. Wang. Taipei: Pyramid Press. 405–407. ISBN 957-9268-55-X.
- Ruhlen, Merritt (1995e). "Worldwide Analysis of Genetic and Linguistic Relationships of Human Populations". Cambridge Archaeological Journal. 5: 265–68.
- Ruhlen, Merritt (1998a). "The origin of the Na-Dene" (PDF). Proceedings of the National Academy of Sciences. 95 (23): 13994–13996. Bibcode:1998PNAS...9513994R. doi:10.1073/pnas.95.23.13994. PMC 25007. PMID 9811914.
- Ruhlen, Merritt. 1998b. Dene–Caucasian: A New Linguistic Family. In Omoto, Keiichi; Tobias, Phillip V., eds. The Origins and Past of Modern Humans—Towards Reconciliation. Singapore: World Scientific.
- RUHLEN, Merritt (2004), "On the Amerind Origin of the Proto-Algonquian Numeral Suffix *-a:šyeka", in JONES, Martin (ed.), Traces of ancestry: studies in honour of Colin Renfrew, Cambridge: McDonald Institute for Archaeological Research, pp. 139–142, ISBN 978-1-902937-25-0
- SALMONS, Joseph (1997), "'Global Etymology' as Pre-Copernican Linguistics", California Liŋ ′ɡwɪs Tɪk Notes, 25 (1), Fullerton: Program in Linguistics, California State University: 1, 5–7, 60, ISSN 1548-1484
- SAPIR, Edward (1984), "Letter to A. L. Kroeber (1918)", The Sapir-Kroeber correspondence: letters between Edward Sapir and A. L. Kroeber, 1905–1925, Berkeley: University of California at Berkeley, Survey of California and Other Indian Languages, OCLC: 17922146
- STAROSTIN, Sergei A. (July 13, 2004), Merritt Ruhlen, Santa Fe Institute.
- RUHLEN, Merritt (July 2001), "Taxonomic Controversies in the Twentieth Century", in TRABANT, Jürgen; WARD, Sean (eds.), New Essays on the Origin of Language, Mouton de Gruyter, pp. 197–214, ISBN 978-3-11-017025-2
- TRASK, R. L. (1996), Historical Linguistics, London; New York: Arnold; St. Martin's Press, ISBN 978-0-340-66295-3
- Vajda, Edward J. 2010. Yeniseian, Na-Dene, and Historical Linguistics. In J. Kari and B. Potter, eds., The Dene–Yeniseian Connection. Fairbanks: University of Alaska Fairbanks, Department of Anthropology. Anthropological Papers of the University of Alaska, new series, vol. 5. pp. 100–118.
- WATTERS, David (2006), "Notes on Kusunda Grammar: A language isolate of Nepal" (PDF), Himalayan Linguistics Archive (3): 1–182: pp. 9, 10, 15, 33, archived from the original (PDF) on June 22, 2010
- WERNER, Heinrich K. (2004): Zur jenissejisch-indianischen Urverwandtschaft [On the Yeniseian-[American] Indian primordial relationship]. Wiesbaden: Harrassowitz
- WHITEHOUSE, Paul; USHER, Timothy; RUHLEN, Merritt; WANG, William S.-Y. (April 13, 2004), "Kusunda: an Indo-Pacific Language in Nepal", Proceedings of the National Academy of Sciences, 101 (15), United States National Academy of Sciences: 5692–5695, Bibcode:2004PNAS..101.5692W, doi:10.1073/pnas.0400233101, ISSN 0027-8424, PMC 397480, PMID 15056764
