= Proto-human =

Proto-human may refer to:

- Archaic Homo sapiens, a loosely defined classification that includes a number of varieties of Homo
- Australopithecina, a collective classification of extinct, close relatives of humans, some of which are probable ancestors of humans and early hominins
- Proto-Human language, a designation of the hypothetical most recent common ancestor of all the world's languages

== See also ==
- Human evolution
