= Na-Dene languages =

Indigenous North American language family

Na-Dene
- Athabaskan–Eyak–Tlingit
- Geographic distribution: North America
- Linguistic classification: One of the world's primary language families (or Dene–Yeniseian?)
- Subdivisions: Tlingit; Athabaskan–Eyak

Language codes
- ISO 639-5: xnd
- Glottolog: atha1245
- Distribution of Na-Dene languages

Na-Dene (/ˌnɑːdɪˈneɪ/ NAH-dih-NAY; also Nadene, Na-Dené, Athabaskan–Eyak–Tlingit, Tlina–Dene) is a family of Native American languages that includes at least the Athabaskan languages, Eyak, and Tlingit languages. Haida was formerly included but is now generally considered a language isolate. By far the most widely spoken Na-Dene language today is Navajo, which is also the most spoken indigenous language north of Mexico.

Some linguists have proposed a genetic relationship between Na-Dene and the Yeniseian languages of central Siberia, termed Dene–Yeniseian. However, this proposal is not universally accepted.

== Etymology ==
Edward Sapir originally devised the term Na-Dene to refer to a combined family of Athabaskan, Tlingit, and Haida (the existence of the Eyak language was not known to him at the time). In his "The Na-Dene languages: A preliminary report", he describes how he arrived at the term:

The name that I have chosen for the stock, Na-dene, may be justified by reference to no. 51 of the comparative vocabulary. Dene, in various dialectic forms, is a wide-spread Athabaskan term for "person, people"; the element *-ne (*-n, *-η) which forms part of it is an old stem for "person, people" which, as suffix or prefix, is frequently used in Athabaskan in that sense. It is cognate with H. [= Haida] na "to dwell; house" and Tl. [= Tlingit] na "people". The compound term Na-dene thus designates by means of native stems the speakers of the three languages concerned, besides continuing the use of the old term Dene for the Athabaskan branch of the stock.

== Family division ==
In its uncontroversial core, Na-Dene consists of two branches, Tlingit and Athabaskan–Eyak:

- Na-Dene
  - Tlingit
  - Athabaskan–Eyak
    - Eyak †, revitalizing
    - Athabaskan
      - Northern
      - Pacific Coast †
      - Southern

For linguists who follow Edward Sapir in connecting Haida to the above languages, Haida represents an additional branch, with Athabaskan–Eyak–Tlingit together forming the other. Dene or Dine (the Athabaskan languages) is a widely distributed group of Native languages spoken by associated peoples in Alberta, British Columbia, Manitoba, the Northwest Territories, Nunavut, Saskatchewan, Yukon, Alaska, parts of Oregon, northern California, and the American Southwest as far as northern Mexico.

The southwestern division of Athabaskan is also called Southern Athabaskan or Apachean, and includes Navajo and all the Apache languages. Eyak was spoken by the Eyak people in south-central Alaska; the last first-language speaker died in 2008. Navajo is by far the most widely spoken language of the Na-Dene family, spoken in Arizona, New Mexico, and other regions of the American Southwest.

== Typology ==
All of these languages share a highly complex prefixing verb structure in which tense and mood markers are interdigitated between subject and object agreement markers. The morphological hallmark of the family is a series of prefixes found directly before the verb root that raise or lower the transitivity of the verb word. These prefixes, traditionally known as "classifiers", derive historically from a combination of three distinct classes of morphemes and are not found in any other Native American language family.

The phoneme system contains a large number of dorsal (velar or uvular) consonants (fronting in many modern Athabaskan languages to palatals and velars, correspondingly) as well as a general absence of labial obstruents (except where /b/ has arisen from *w). In the historical phonology there is a widespread tendency, observable across many Athabaskan languages, for phonemic tonal distinctions to arise from glottal features originally found at the end of the syllable. The glottal features in question are often evident in Eyak or Tlingit. These languages are typologically unusual in containing extensive prefixation yet being SOV and postpositional, features normally associated with suffixing languages.

== External classification ==
A genealogical connection between the Tlingit, Eyak and Athabaskan languages was suggested early in the 19th century, but not universally accepted until much later. Haida, with 15 fluent speakers (M. Krauss, 1995), was originally linked to Tlingit by Franz Boas in 1894. Both Haida and Tlingit were then connected to Athabaskan by Edward Sapir in 1915. Linguists such as Lyle Campbell today consider the evidence inconclusive. They have classified Haida as a language isolate. In order to emphasise the exclusion of Haida, Campbell refers to the language family as Athabaskan–Eyak–Tlingit rather than Na-Dene. In 2010 Jeff Leer published extensive primary materials on what he calls PAET (Proto-Athabaskan–Eyak–Tlingit).

=== Dene–Yeniseian ===
Connections between the Na-Dené family and the Siberian languages have occasionally been proposed, possibly as early as 1923. As evidence has mounted that the Americas were populated by people who crossed the Bering Sea land bridge from Siberia, such proposals have grown more historically plausible.

The best-known of these proposals is the Dené–Yeniseian languages hypothesis from Edward Vajda and others. Under this hypothesis, the Na-Dené languages might be related to the Yeniseian (or Yeniseic) languages of Siberia, the only living representative of which is the Ket language. The core motivations for the proposed family connection are homologies in verb prefixes and a systematic correspondence between the distribution of Ket tones and consonant articulations found in Athabaskan–Eyak–Tlingit. (Note: The term Athabaskan–Eyak–Tlingit may be used instead of Na-Dene when an author wishes to clarify that Haida is excluded from the family in this theory (due to disagreements about Haida's status as an isolate).)

=== Sino–Tibetan ===
A link between the Na–Dene languages and Sino–Tibetan languages, known as Sino–Dene, was first proposed by Edward Sapir. Around 1920, Sapir became convinced that Na–Dene was more closely related to Sino–Tibetan than to other American families. He wrote a series of letters to Alfred Kroeber where he enthusiastically spoke of a connection between Na–Dene and "Indo–Chinese". In 1925, a supporting article summarizing his thoughts, albeit not written by him, entitled "The Similarities of Chinese and Indian Languages", was published in Science Supplements. The Sino–Dene hypothesis never gained foothold in the United States outside of Sapir's circle, though it was later revitalized by Robert Shafer (1952, 1957, 1969) and Morris Swadesh (1952, 1965). Alfredo Trombetti, who was the first to propose a relationship between the Yeniseian and Na–Dene language families (1923), had also independently proposed the idea of Sino–Dene (1923, 1925).

=== Other proposals ===
According to Joseph Greenberg's controversial classification of the languages of Native North America, Na-Dene (including Haida) is one of the three main groups of Native languages spoken in the Americas. Contemporary supporters of Greenberg's theory, such as Merritt Ruhlen, suggested that the Na-Dene language family represents a distinct migration of people from Asia into the New World that occurred six to eight thousand years ago, placing it around four thousand years later than the previous migration into the Americas by Amerind speakers; this remains an unproven hypothesis. Ruhlen speculates that the Na-Dene speakers may have arrived in boats, initially settling near the Haida Gwaii, now in British Columbia, Canada.

Bouda, in various publications in the 1930s through the 1950s, described a linguistic network that (besides Yeniseian and Sino-Tibetan) also included Caucasian, and Burushaski, some forms of which have gone by the name of Sino-Caucasian. The works of R. Bleichsteiner and O.G. Tailleur, the late Sergei A. Starostin and Sergei L. Nikolayev have sought to confirm these connections. Others who have developed the hypothesis, often expanded to Dene–Caucasian, include J.D. Bengtson, V. Blažek, J.H. Greenberg (with M. Ruhlen), and M. Ruhlen. George Starostin continues his father's work in Yeniseian, Sino-Caucasian and other fields. This theory is very controversial or viewed as obsolete by other linguists.

== Genetics and dispersal ==
Speakers of the Na-Dene languages, while mostly closely related to other North American indigenous peoples, derive around 10% of their ancestry from a Siberian source closely related to Koryaks and not found in other Native American groups. The contact between the ancestors of Na-Dene speakers and this Siberian group is suggested to have occurred around 9,000-5,500 years ago. The urheimat has been suggested to have been in Alaska. A large southward migration of Athabaskan peoples is thought to have occurred around 1,000 years ago, resulting in the settlement of southern North America.

== Obstruent correspondences ==
This phonological chart shows where the listed varieties have sounds which are the same, similar, and sometimes different. The sounds shown, obstruents, are a particular class of consonants. Where similarities are found between one or more varieties, this presents at least some evidence of genetic relatedness among those varieties.

Obstruent correspondences
PAET (Note: Proto-Athabaskan–Eyak–Tlingit)	PAE (Note: Proto-Athabaskan–Eyak)	PA (Note: Proto-Athabaskan)	Eyak	Tlingit	
PAET	PAE	PA	Eyak	Normal	L-assim.
d					
t					
tʼ					
tɬʼ				ɬʼ, tɬʼ	
ɬ		ɬ~l	ɬ		
dʒ					?
tʃ				tʃ (ts)	tɬ
tʃʼ				sʼ, tʃʼ (tsʼ)	tɬʼ
ʃ		ʂ~ʐ	ʃ (s)		ɬ
ɡʲ	dz	[dz], s~z	dz	ɡ	
ts	ts			ts	tɬ
kʲ	ts			k, ʃ	
tsʼ	tsʼ			sʼ, tsʼ	tɬʼ, ɬ
kʲʼ	tsʼ			kʼ	
s	s	s~z	s		ʃ
xʲ	s	s~z	s; ʃ	x	
ɡ		ɡʲ	ɡ	ɡ(ʷ)	
ɡʷ		ɖʐ	ɡʷ → ɡ	ɡ(ʷ)	
k		kʲ	k	k(ʷ)	
kʷ		ʈʂ	kʷ → k	k(ʷ)	
kʼ		kʲʼ	kʼ	xʼ(ʷ), kʼ(ʷ)	
kʷʼ		ʈʂʼ	kʼʷ → kʼ	xʼ(ʷ), kʼ(ʷ)	
x		xʲ~j	x	x	
xʷ		ʂ~ʐ	xʷ → x	x	
ɢ			ɢ	ɢ(ʷ)	
ɢʷ		ɢʷ → ɢ	ɢ	ɢ(ʷ)	
q			q	q(ʷ)	
qʷ		qʷ → q	q	q(ʷ)	
qʼ			qʼ	χʼ(ʷ)	
qʷʼ		qʷʼ → qʼ	qʼ	χʼ, qʼ(ʷ)	
χ		χ~ʁ	χ	χ(ʷ)	
χʷ		χʷ → χ~ʁ	χʷ	χ(ʷ)	
Extrasystematic fricative correspondences
sx	x	xʲ~j	x	s	
ʃx	x	xʲ~j	ʃ		
$	x(ʷ) ?	$ (ʃ~xʲ)	xʷ → x; s	χ	

Table notes:

1. To prevent cluttering the table, phonemes in the PAET, PAE and PA columns are not asterisked.
2. Leer (2008, 2010) does not reconstruct the PAET affricates */dɮ/, */tɬ/ and */dz/. Judging from their rarity, he assumes they may be attributable to the resolution of former consonant clusters.
3. In Athabaskan and Eyak, sibilants can be diminutive variants of shibilants. In Tlingit, on the other hand, shibilants might sometimes be diminutive variants of sibilants. These correspondences are in parentheses.

== See also ==
- Athabaskan languages
- Dene–Yeniseian languages
- Southern Athabaskan languages
