= Amerind languages =

Rejected language macrofamily proposal of the Americas

Amerind
- (Widely rejected)
- Geographic distribution: Americas
- Linguistic classification: Proposed language family
- Subdivisions: Almosan–Keresiouan; Hokan–Penutian; Central Amerind; Andean–Chibchan–Paezan; Equatorial–Tucanoan; Ge–Pano–Carib

Language codes
- Glottolog: None
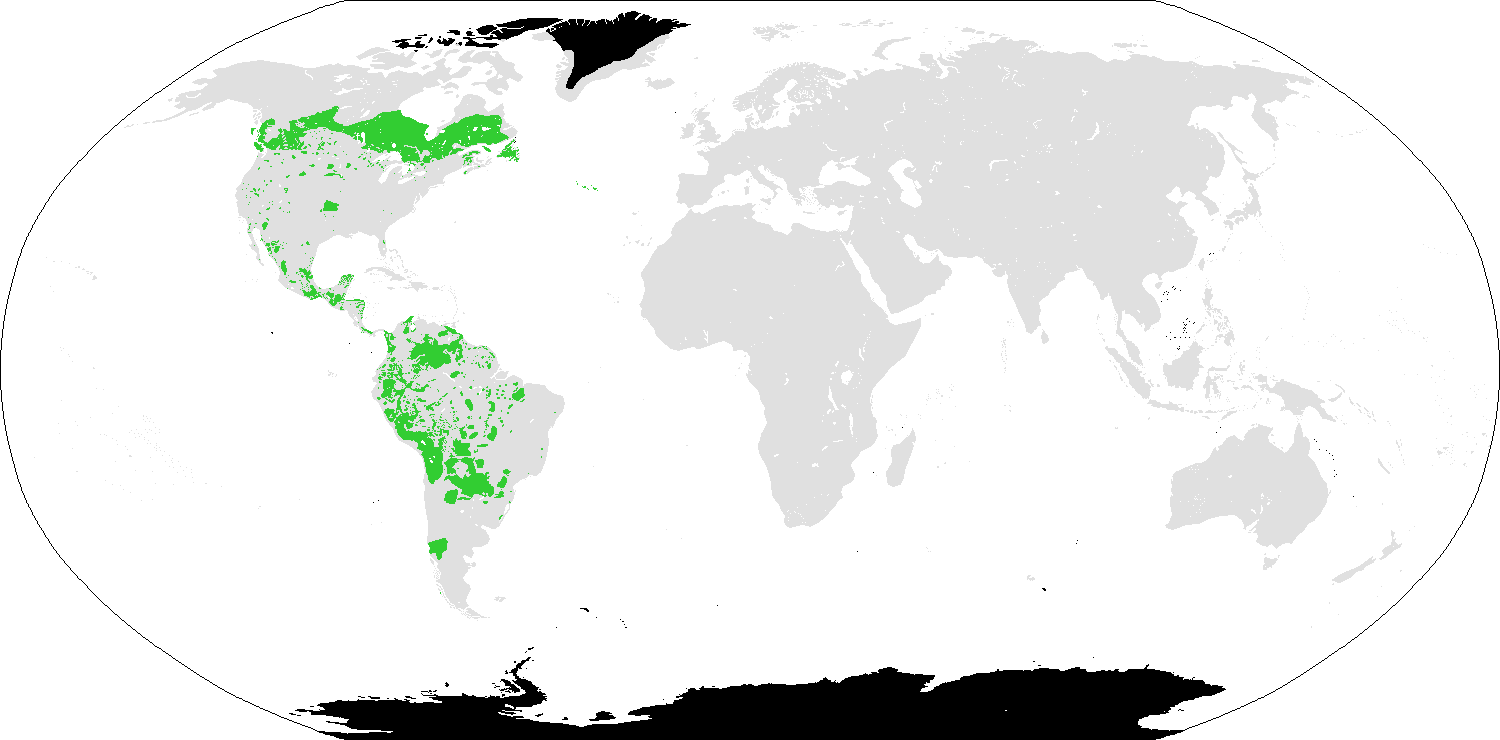
- Present distribution of proposed Amerind languages

Amerind is a rejected higher-level language family proposed by Joseph Greenberg in 1960 and elaborated by his student Merritt Ruhlen. Greenberg proposed that all of the indigenous languages of the Americas belong to one of three language families, the previously established Eskimo–Aleut and Na–Dene, and with everything else—otherwise classified by specialists as belonging to dozens of independent families—as Amerind. Because of a large number of methodological issues with the 1987 book Language in the Americas, the relationships he proposed between these languages have been rejected by historical linguists as spurious.

The term Amerind is also occasionally used to refer broadly to the various indigenous languages of the Americas without necessarily implying that they are a genealogical group. To avoid ambiguity, the term "Amerindian" is often used to refer to the latter meaning.

== Background ==
The idea that all the languages of the Americas are related goes back to the 19th century, when early linguists such as Peter Stephen DuPonceau and Wilhelm von Humboldt noticed that the languages of the Americas seemed to be very different from the better-known European languages, yet seemingly also quite similar to each other. When studies of American Indian languages began in earnest in the early 20th century, linguists quickly realized that the indigenous languages were not all that similar and had a diversity far greater than that among European languages. After a period of uncertainty about whether indigenous languages could be described and investigated using the methods applied to European languages, the first linguists began the daunting task of classifying the languages of the Americas using the comparative method.

Among the most prolific and gifted linguists of his time was Edward Sapir, who was among the first to apply the comparative method to Native American languages. However, contrary to current practice in historical linguistics, Sapir also often relied on "hunches" and "gut feelings" when proposing new language families. Some of these suggestions have been proven correct, while others have not. Sapir entertained the idea that ultimately all languages of the Americas might turn out to be provably related, and such a phenomenon as the apparent Pan-American tendency to have first-person forms with a prefixed n- was suggestive for this line of thought.

Since Sapir died in 1939, linguists have spent their time researching his proposals; typically, there have been two opposing camps in this endeavor: the so-called "lumpers" who usually look towards notions of genetic relationships, and the "splitters" who are widely critical of such proposals and expect successful family relations to be proven by the most rigorous standards of scholarship. Joseph Greenberg worked in the tradition of "lumpers" and, following Sapir, was mindful of evidence that is not generally accepted by those who hold that only actual linguistic reconstruction—through the comparative method—can yield reliable proof of genetic relationships between languages. In elaborating his classification of Amerind languages, Greenberg relied heavily on Sapir's early work on North American languages and on the highly impressionistic classification of South American languages by Paul Rivet.

== Pronouns ==
Selected similarities in pronouns
Language	Family	1sg	2sg
Karok	(isolate)	na	'im
Kiliwa	Yuman	ñap	may
Nahuatl	Uto-Aztecan	no-	mo-
Arhuaco	Chibchan	nən	ma
Aymara	Aymaran	naya	juma
Mapudungun	Araucanian	-n	eymi, -m

The main argument for the validity of Amerind is a pronominal pattern in many Native American languages that have first-person forms with n and second-person forms with m. This pattern was first noted by Alfredo Trombetti in 1905. Sapir suggested that it indicated that ultimately all Native American languages would turn out to be related. However, it is not universal, being confined primarily to western North America and to a lesser extent Mesoamerica; the incidence elsewhere is not statistically significant, and in western North American it is more an argument for the Hokan and Penutian phyla than for Amerind.

== Gender ==
Ruhlen reconstructed a morphological (ablaut) gender system for proto-Amerind, with masculine kinship terms containing the vowel *i and feminine the vowel *u, that he claims proves Greenberg's reconstruction. This is based on Greenberg's *t'a'na "child", to which Ruhlen adds a masculine derivation *t'i'na "son, boy" and a feminine *t'u'na "daughter, girl".

Unlike the n-/m- pattern in the pronouns, an intact i/u gender system is not attested across language families, and the consensus is that the pattern is a spurious one.

== Reception ==
The consensus among historical linguists specializing in Native American languages is that the Amerind hypothesis is unsupported by valid evidence, particularly because the basis for the proposal is mass comparison, but also because of many other methodological flaws made by Greenberg in the elaboration of the hypothesis. Critics regard this technique as fundamentally flawed, unable to distinguish chance resemblances from those due to a historical relationship among the languages and providing no means of distinguishing resemblances due to common descent from those due to language contact. In addition, critics have pointed out errors in the citation of data, including erroneous forms, erroneous glosses, unjustified morphological segmentation, attribution to the wrong language, and citation of entirely spurious forms. For example, a supposed Lencan language "Membreno" was actually the misspelled name of Alberto de Jesús Membreño, an author for a book he cited, and all the listed words for Quapaw were from either Ofo or Biloxi.

A further criticism is that, contrary to normal scholarly practice, no source references are given for the data, which in most cases come from languages for which there is no standard, authoritative source. In addition, Greenberg does not normalize the spelling of the data, so it is impossible without knowing the source of each form to know what the notation represents.

While sympathetic to the idea of an Amerind language family, Morris Swadesh was critical of many of Greenberg's subdivisions and believed it was due to an insufficient number of comparisons by Greenberg.

== Classification ==
The 1960 proposal, in its outlines, was as follows:

- Amerind
  - Almosan-Keresiouan
  - Hokan
  - Penutian (incl. Macro-Mayan)
  - Aztec-Tanoan
  - Oto-Manguean
  - Purépecha
  - Macro-Chibchan
    - Chibchan
    - Paezan
  - Andean–Equatorial
    - Andean
    - Jivaroan
    - Macro-Tucanoan
    - Equatorial (with Macro-Arawakan and Tupian)
  - Ge–Pano–Carib
    - Macro-Ge
    - Macro-Panoan
    - Macro-Carib
    - Nambikwara
    - Huarpe
    - Taruma

Below is the current state of Amerindian classification, as given in An Amerind Etymological Dictionary, by Joseph Greenberg and Merritt Ruhlen, Stanford University, 2007.

- Amerind
  - North–Central Amerind
    - Northern Amerind
      - Almosan–Keresiouan
        - Almosan
          - Algic
          - Kutenai
          - Mosan
            - Chimakuan
            - Salishan
            - Wakashan
        - Keresiouan
          - Caddoan
          - Iroquoian
          - Keresan
          - Siouan–Yuchi
            - Siouan
            - Yuchi
      - Penutian–Hokan
        - Penutian
          - Tsimshian
          - Chinook
          - Oregon
          - Plateau
          - California
            - Maiduan
            - Miwok–Costanoan
            - Wintun
            - Yokutsan
          - Zuni
          - Gulf
            - Atakapa
            - Chitimacha
            - Muskogean
            - Natchez
            - Tunica
            - Yukian
              - Yuki
              - Wappo
          - Mexican Penutian
            - Huave
            - Mayan
            - Mixe–Zoque
            - Totonac
        - Hokan
          - Northern Hokan
            - Karok–Shasta
              - Karok
              - Chimariko
              - Shasta–Achomawi
                - Shasta
                - Achomawi
            - Yana
            - Pomoan
          - Washo
          - Salinan–Chumash
            - Salinan
            - Chumash
            - Esselen
          - Seri–Yuman
            - Seri
            - Yuman
          - Waicuri–Quinigua
            - Waicuri
            - Maratino
            - Quinigua
          - Coahuiltecan
          - Tequistlatec
          - Subtiaba
          - Jicaque
          - Yurumangui
    - Central Amerind
      - Tanoan
      - Uto-Aztekan
      - Oto-Manguean
  - Southern Amerind
    - Andean–Chibchan–Paezan
      - Chibchan–Paezan
        - Macro-Chibchan
          - Cuitlatec
          - Lenca
          - Chibchan (including Misumalpan)
          - Paya
          - Purépecha
          - Yanomam
          - Yunca–Puruhan
        - Macro-Paezan
          - Allentiac
          - Atacama
          - Betoi
          - Chimu
          - Itonama
          - Jirajara
          - Mura
          - Paezan
          - Timucua
          - Warrao
      - Andean
        - Aymara
        - Itucale–Sabela
          - Itucale
          - Mayna
          - Sabela
        - Cahuapana–Zaparo
          - Cahuapana
          - Zaparo
        - Northern Andean
          - Catacao
          - Cholona
          - Culli
          - Leco
          - Sechura
        - Quechua
        - Southern Andean
          - Qawasqar
          - Mapudungu
          - Gennaken
          - Chon
          - Yamana
    - Equatorial–Tucanoan
      - Equatorial
        - Macro-Arawakan
          - Guahibo
          - Katembri
          - Otomaco
          - Tinigua
          - Arawakan
            - Arawa
            - Maipuran
            - Chapacura
            - Guamo
            - Uro (including Puquina)
        - Cayuvava
        - Coche
        - Jivaro–Kandoshi
          - Cofán
          - Esmeralda
          - Jivaro
          - Kandoshi
          - Yaruro
        - Kariri–Tupi
        - Piaroa
        - Taruma
        - Timote
        - Trumai
        - Tusha
        - Yuracaré
        - Zamuco
      - Macro-Tucanoan
        - Auixiri
        - Canichana
        - Capixana
        - Catuquina
        - Gamella
        - Huari
        - Iranshe
        - Kaliana–Maku
        - Koaia
        - Movima
        - Muniche
        - Nambikwara
        - Natu
        - Pankaruru
        - Puinave
        - Shukuru
        - Ticuna–Yuri
        - Tucanoan
        - Uman
    - Ge–Pano–Carib
      - Macro-Carib
        - Andoke
        - Bora–Uitoto
        - Carib
        - Kukura [spurious]
        - Yagua
      - Macro-Panoan
        - Charruan
        - Lengua
        - Lule–Vilela
        - Mataco–Guaicuru
        - Moseten
        - Pano–Tacanan
      - Macro-Gê
        - Bororo
        - Botocudo
        - Caraja
        - Chiquito
        - Erikbatsa
        - Fulnio
        - Ge–Kaingang
        - Guató
        - Kamakan
        - Mashakali
        - Opaie
        - Oti
        - Puri
        - Yabuti

== See also ==
- Principal advocates of the Amerind hypothesis or its predecessors
  - Alfredo Trombetti
  - Joseph H. Greenberg
  - Merritt Ruhlen
- Non-Amerind American language families
  - Na-Dené
  - Eskaleut
- M–T and N–M pronoun patterns
