= Journal of Chinese Linguistics =

- Discipline: Linguistics
- Language: Chinese, English
- Edited by: Shengli Feng & Jie Xu

Publication details
- History: 1973-present
- Publisher: The Chinese University of Hong Kong Press (Hong Kong)
- Frequency: Triannually
- Impact factor: 0.25 (2024)

Standard abbreviations
- ISO 4: J. Chin. Linguist.

Indexing
- ISSN: 0091-3723
- LCCN: 73644070
- OCLC no.: 1787085

Links
- Journal homepage; Online archive

The Journal of Chinese Linguistics is a peer-reviewed academic journal in the field of linguistics, particularly concerned with all aspects of the Chinese language. It was established in 1973 and is now published twice a year by University of California at Berkeley. The current editors-in-chief are Shengli Feng (Beijing Language and Culture University) and Jie Xu (University of Macau). According to the Journal Citation Reports, the journal has a 2024 impact factor of 0.25, ranking it 185th out of 194 journals in the category "Linguistics".
