= Alfredo Trombetti =

Italian linguist (1866–1929)

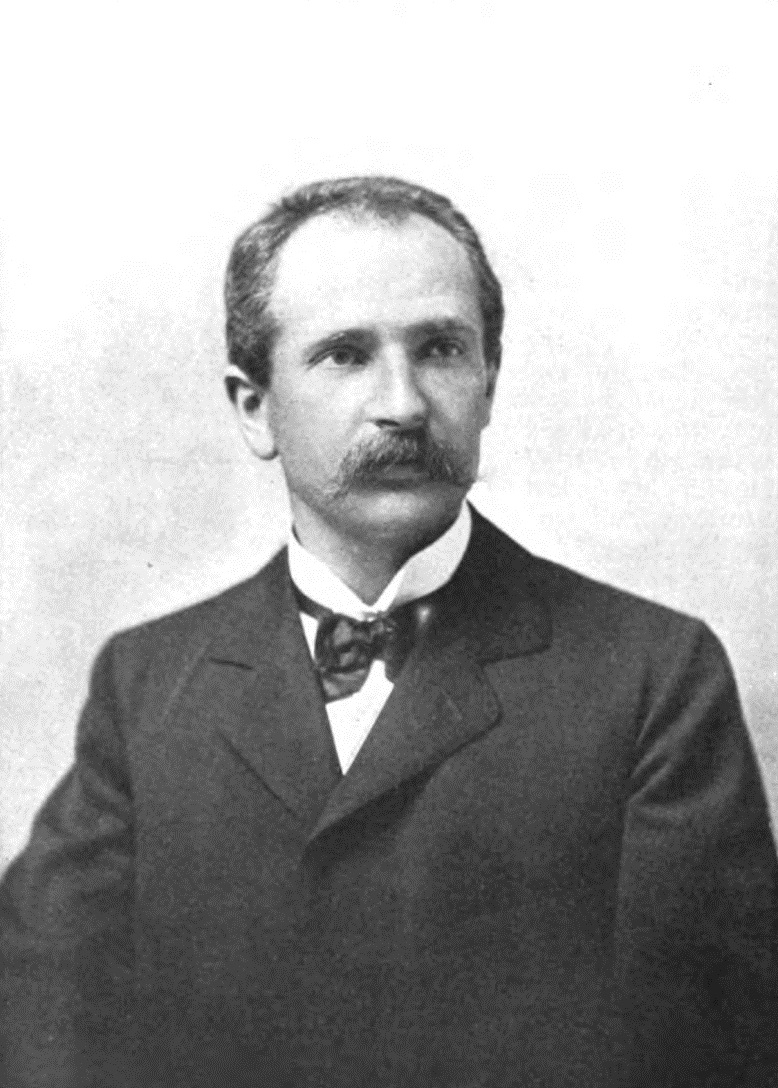
- Trombetti sometime before 1905
- Born: 16 January 1866; Bologna, Kingdom of Italy
- Died: 5 July 1929 (aged 63); Venice, Kingdom of Italy
- Occupation: Linguist

Academic work
- Institutions: University of Bologna
- Main interests: Comparative linguistics
- Notable ideas: Monogenesis

Alfredo Trombetti (16 January 1866 in Bologna – 5 July 1929 in Venice) was an Italian linguist active in the early 20th century.

== Career overview ==
Trombetti was a professor at the University of Bologna. He was a member of the Italian Academy.

He is best known as an advocate of the doctrine of monogenesis, according to which all of the world's languages go back to a single common ancestral language. His arguments for monogenesis were first presented in his book L'unità d'origine del linguaggio, published in 1905. This doctrine is still extremely controversial.

== Proposed etymologies ==
A selection of Trombetti's proposed global etymologies:

Meaning	Root
to hear; ear	kul (kur)
water	ma; wad (wad, wed, wod), ud
dog	ku (ku-ari, ku-ri, etc.)
hair	tuk, suk
behind, back	kata, taka
foot	ganga; pat
earth (clay, ash)	tu
dust	twar, tur (< tu 'earth')
woman	na (nai)
man (person)	ku, etc.
man (male)	mar
egg (testicle)	umu (mu-n, mu-r, etc.)

== Selected works ==
- 1902-1903. "Delle relazioni delle lingue caucasiche con le lingue camitosemitiche e con altri gruppi linguistichi. Lettera al professore H. Schuchardt." In Giornale della Società asiatica italiana, T. 15, pp. 177–201 and T. 16, pp. 145–175. Florence.
- 1902. Nessi genealogici fra le lingue del mondo antîco, 4 volumes, unpublished. Recipient of the Royal Prize of the Italian Academy in 1902.
- 1905. L'unità d'origine del linguaggio. Bologna: Luigi Beltrami.
- 1907. Come si fa la critica di un libro. Con nuovi contributi alla dottrina della monogenesi del linguaggio e alla glottologia generale comparata. Bologna: Luigi Beltrami.
- 1908. Saggi di glottologia generale comparata I. I pronomi personali. Accademia delle scienze dell'Istituto di Bologna. Classe de scienze morali. Bologna.
- 1912. Manuale dell'arabo parlato a Tripoli. Grammatica, letture e vocabolario. Bologna: Luigi Beltrami.
- 1913. Saggi di glottologia generale comparata II. I numerali. Accademia delle scienze dell'Istituto di Bologna. Classe de scienze morali. Bologna.
- 1920. Saggi di glottologia generale comparata III. Comparazioni lessicali. Accademia delle scienze dell'Istituto di Bologna. Classe de scienze morali. Bologna.
- 1922-1923. Elementi di glottologia, 2 volumes. Bologna: Zanichelli.
- 1925. Le origini della lingua basca. Bologna: Azzoguidi.
- 1927. "La lingua etrusca e le lingue preindoeuropee del Meditarreneo." In Studi etruschi, T. 1. Florence.
- 1928. La lingua etrusca. Florence: Rinascimento del libro.
- 1928. "Origine asiatica delle lingue e popolazioni americane." In Atti del 22 congresso internazionale degli americanisti, Roma, Settembre 1926, T. 1, pp. 169–246. Rome: Istituto Cristoforo Colombo.
- 1929. Il nostro dialetto bolognese. Bologna: Zanichelli.

== See also ==
- Dene–Yeniseian languages
