= Joseph Greenberg =

American linguist (1915–2001)

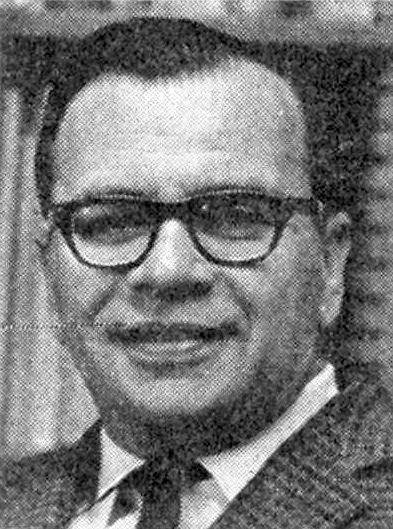
- Greenberg c. 1967
- Born: Joseph Harold Greenberg; May 28, 1915; Brooklyn, New York, U.S.
- Died: May 7, 2001 (aged 85); Stanford, California, U.S.
- Spouse: Selma Berkowitz (m. 1943)
- Awards: Haile Selassie I Prize for African Research (1967); Talcott Parsons Prize for Social Science (1997)

Academic background
- Education: Columbia College; Northwestern University; Yale University
- Doctoral advisor: Melville J. Herskovits

Academic work
- Discipline: Linguist
- Institutions: University of Minnesota; Columbia University; Stanford University
- Doctoral students: George W. Grace
- Main interests: Linguistic typology; Genetic classification of languages; Amerind languages
- Influenced: Merritt Ruhlen

Joseph Harold Greenberg (May 28, 1915 – May 7, 2001) was an American linguist, known mainly for his work concerning linguistic typology and the genetic classification of languages.

== Life ==
=== Early life and education ===
Joseph Greenberg was born on May 28, 1915, to Jewish parents in Brooklyn, New York. His first great interest was music. At the age of 14, he gave a piano concert in Steinway Hall. He continued to play the piano frequently throughout his life.

After graduating from James Madison High School, he decided to pursue a scholarly career rather than a musical one. He enrolled at Columbia College in New York in 1932. During his senior year, he attended a class taught by Franz Boas concerning American Indian languages. He graduated in 1936 with a bachelor's degree. With references from Boas and Ruth Benedict, he was accepted as a graduate student by Melville J. Herskovits at Northwestern University in Chicago and graduated in 1940 with a doctorate degree. During the course of his graduate studies, Greenberg did fieldwork among the Hausa people of Nigeria, where he learned the Hausa language. The subject of his doctoral dissertation was the influence of Islam on a Hausa group that, unlike most others, had not converted to it.

During 1940, he began postdoctoral studies at Yale University. These were interrupted by service in the U.S. Army Signal Corps during World War II, for which he worked as a codebreaker in North Africa and participated with the landing at Casablanca. He then served in Italy until the end of the war.

Before leaving for Europe during 1943, Greenberg married Selma Berkowitz, whom he had met during his first year at Columbia University.

=== Career ===
After the war, Greenberg taught at the University of Minnesota before returning to Columbia University in 1948 as a teacher of anthropology. While in New York, he became acquainted with Roman Jakobson and André Martinet. They introduced him to the Prague school of structuralism, which influenced his work.

In 1962, Greenberg relocated to the anthropology department at Stanford University in California, where he continued working for the rest of his life. In 1965 Greenberg served as president of the African Studies Association. That same year, he was elected to the United States National Academy of Sciences. He was later elected to the American Academy of Arts and Sciences (1973) and the American Philosophical Society (1975).

== Contributions to linguistics ==
=== Methodology ===
Greenberg said, "Let us assume even that accident resemblances between two languages can be rather high, say twenty percent. The chance that some single meaningful form will appear with similar sound and meaning is then 1/5."

=== Linguistic typology ===
Greenberg has been described as a founder of modern linguistic typology. His publications contributed to the development in the field through the 1960s and 1970s. Greenberg's work in synchronic linguistics focused on identifying linguistic universals. During the late 1950s, Greenberg began to examine languages covering a wide geographic and genetic distribution. He identified a number of proposed linguistic universals and cross-linguistic tendencies.

In particular, Greenberg conceptualized the idea of "implicational universal", which has the form, "if a language has structure X, then it must also have structure Y." For example, X might be "mid front rounded vowels" and Y "high front rounded vowels" (for terminology see phonetics). Many scholars adopted this kind of research following Greenberg's example and it remains important in synchronic linguistics.

Like Noam Chomsky, Greenberg sought to discover the universal structures on which human language is based. Unlike Chomsky, Greenberg's method was functionalist, rather than formalist.

=== Mass comparison ===
Greenberg rejected the opinion, prevalent among linguists since the mid-20th century, that comparative reconstruction was the only method to discover relationships between languages. He argued that genetic classification is methodologically prior to comparative reconstruction, or the first stage of it: one cannot engage in the comparative reconstruction of languages until one knows which languages to compare (1957:44).

He also criticized the prevalent opinion that comprehensive comparisons of two languages at a time (which commonly take years to perform) could establish language families of any size. He argued that the number of possible classifications increases exponentially with the number of languages compared (1957:44). For comparison, the proposed Niger–Congo family is said to have some 1,500 languages. He thought language families of any size needed to be established by some scholastic means other than bilateral comparison. The theory of mass comparison is an attempt to demonstrate such means.

Greenberg argued for the virtues of breadth over depth. He advocated restricting the amount of material to be compared (to basic vocabulary, morphology, and known paths of sound change) and increasing the number of languages to be compared to all the languages in a given area. He hypothesised that this would make it possible to compare numerous languages reliably. At the same time, the process would provide a check on accidental resemblances through the sheer number of languages under review.

Greenberg used the premise that mass "borrowing" of basic vocabulary is unknown. He argued that borrowing, when it occurs, is concentrated in cultural vocabulary and clusters "in certain semantic areas", making it easy to detect. With the goal of determining broad patterns of relationship, the idea was not to get every word right but to detect patterns. From the beginning with his theory of mass comparison, Greenberg addressed why chance resemblance and borrowing were not obstacles to its being useful. Despite that, critics consider those phenomena caused difficulties for his theory.

Greenberg first termed his method "mass comparison" in an article of 1954 (reprinted in Greenberg 1955). As of 1987, he replaced the term "mass comparison" with "multilateral comparison", to emphasize its contrast with the bilateral comparisons recommended by linguistics textbooks. He believed that multilateral comparison was not in any way opposed to the comparative method, but is, on the contrary, its necessary first step (Greenberg, 1957:44). According to him, comparative reconstruction should have the status of an explanatory theory for facts already established by language classification (Greenberg, 1957:45).

Most historical linguists (Campbell 2001:45) reject the use of mass comparison as a method for establishing genealogical relationships between languages. Among the most outspoken critics of mass comparison have been Lyle Campbell, Donald Ringe, William Poser, and the late R. Larry Trask.

=== Genetic classification of languages ===
==== Languages of Africa ====
Greenberg developed a classification system for the languages of Africa, which he published from 1949 to 1954. He revised the book and published it again during 1963, followed by a nearly identical edition in 1966 (reprinted without change during 1970). A few more changes of the classification were made by Greenberg in an article during 1981.

Greenberg grouped the hundreds of African languages into four families, which he dubbed Afroasiatic, Nilo-Saharan, Niger-Congo, and Khoisan. During the course of his work, Greenberg popularised the term "Afroasiatic", originally suggested by Maurice Delafosse, to replace the earlier term "Hamito-Semitic", after showing that the Hamitic group, accepted widely since the 19th century, is not a valid language family. Another feature of his work was to establish the classification of the Bantu languages, spoken in much of Central and Southern Africa, as a part of the Atlantic-Congo family, rather than as an independent family as many Bantuists had maintained.

Greenberg's work on African languages has been criticised by Lyle Campbell and Donald Ringe, who do not believe that his classification is justified by his data and request a re-examination of his macro-phyla by "reliable methods" (Ringe 1993:104). Harold Fleming and Lionel Bender, who were sympathetic to Greenberg's classification, acknowledged that at least some of his macrofamilies (particularly the Nilo-Saharan and the Khoisan macrofamilies) are not accepted completely by most linguists and may need to be divided (Campbell 1997). Their objection was methodological: if mass comparison is not a valid method, it cannot be expected to have brought order successfully out of the confusion of African languages.

By contrast, some linguists have sought to combine Greenberg's four African families into larger units. In particular, Edgar Gregersen (1972) proposed joining Niger-Congo and Nilo-Saharan into a larger family, which he termed Kongo-Saharan. Roger Blench (1995) suggests Niger-Congo is a subfamily of Nilo-Saharan.

==== The languages of New Guinea, Tasmania, and the Andaman Islands ====
During 1971 Greenberg proposed the Indo-Pacific macrofamily, which groups together the Papuan languages (a large number of language families of New Guinea and nearby islands) with the native languages of the Andaman Islands and Tasmania but excludes the Australian Aboriginal languages. Its principal feature was to reduce the manifold language families of New Guinea to a single genetic unit. This excludes the Austronesian languages, which have been established as associated with a more recent migration of people.

Greenberg's subgrouping of these languages has not been accepted by the few specialists who have worked on the classification of these languages. However, the work of Stephen Wurm (1982) and Malcolm Ross (2005) has given a small amount of mainstream support for his hypothesis. Wurm stated that the lexical similarities between the Great Andamanese, West Papuan, and Timor-Alor-Pantar families "are quite striking and amount to virtual formal identity [...] in a number of instances". He believes this to be due to a linguistic substratum.

==== The languages of the Americas ====
Most linguists concerned with the native languages of the Americas classify them into 150 to 180 independent language families. Early on, Greenberg (1957:41, 1960) became convinced that many of the language groups considered unrelated could be classified into larger groupings. In his 1987 book Language in the Americas, while accepting the Eskimo-Aleut and Na-Dené groupings as distinct, he proposed that all the other Native American languages belong to a single language macro-family, which he termed Amerind.

Language in the Americas has generated lively debate, but has been criticized strongly; it is rejected by most specialists of indigenous languages of the Americas and also by most historical linguists. Specialists of the individual language families have found extensive inaccuracies and errors in Greenberg's data, such as data cited from non-existent languages, erroneous transcriptions of the forms compared, misinterpretations of the meanings of words used for comparison, and entirely spurious forms.

Historical linguists also reject the validity of the method of multilateral (or mass) comparison upon which the classification is based. They argue that he has not provided a convincing case that the similarities presented as evidence are due to inheritance from an earlier common ancestor rather than being explained by a combination of errors, accidental similarity, excessive semantic latitude in comparisons, borrowings, onomatopoeia, and other such causes.

However, Harvard geneticist David Reich notes that recent genetic studies have identified patterns that support Greenberg's Amerind classification: the "First American” category. "The cluster of populations that he predicted to be most closely related based on language were in fact verified by the genetic patterns in populations for which data are available.”

==== The languages of northern Eurasia ====
Later in his life, Greenberg proposed that nearly all of the language families of northern Eurasia belong to a single higher-order family, which he termed Eurasiatic. The only exception was Yeniseian, which he attached to a wider Dené–Caucasian grouping, also including Sino-Tibetan. During 2008 Edward Vajda proposed a relation between Yeniseian and the Na-Dené languages of North America as a Dené-Yeniseian family.

The Eurasiatic grouping resembles the older Nostratic proposals of Holger Pedersen and Vladislav Illich-Svitych by including Indo-European, Uralic, Turkic, Tungusic, and Mongolic. It differs by including Nivkh, Japonic, Korean, and Ainu (which most Nostraticists had excluded from comparison because they are single languages rather than language families) and in excluding Afroasiatic. At about this time, Russian Nostraticists, notably Sergei Starostin, constructed a revised version of Nostratic. It was slightly larger than Greenberg's grouping but it also excluded Afroasiatic.

== Selected works by Joseph H. Greenberg ==
=== Books ===
- Studies in African Linguistic Classification. New Haven: Compass Publishing Company. 1955. (Photo-offset reprint of the SJA articles with minor corrections.)
- Essays in Linguistics. Chicago: University of Chicago Press. 1957.
- The Languages of Africa. Bloomington: Indiana University Press. 1963. (Heavily revised version of Greenberg 1955. From the same publisher: second, revised edition, 1966; third edition, 1970. All three editions simultaneously published at The Hague by Mouton & Co.)
- Language Universals: With Special Reference to Feature Hierarchies. The Hague: Mouton & Co. 1966. (Reprinted 1980 and, with a foreword by Martin Haspelmath, 2005.)
- Language in the Americas. Stanford: Stanford University Press. 1987.
- Keith Denning; Suzanne Kemmer, eds. (1990). On Language: Selected Writings of Joseph H. Greenberg. Stanford, CA: Stanford University Press.
- Indo-European and Its Closest Relatives: The Eurasiatic Language Family. Vol. 1: Grammar. Stanford: Stanford University Press. 2000.
- Indo-European and Its Closest Relatives: The Eurasiatic Language Family. Vol. 2: Lexicon. Stanford: Stanford University Press. 2002.
- William Croft, ed. (2005). Genetic Linguistics: Essays on Theory and Method. Oxford: Oxford University Press.

=== Books (editor) ===
- Universals of Language: Report of a Conference Held at Dobbs Ferry, New York, April 13–15, 1961. Cambridge: MIT Press. 1963. (Second edition 1966.)
- Universals of Human Language. Vol. 1: Method and Theory, 2: Phonology, 3: Word Structure, 4: Syntax. Stanford: Stanford University Press. 1978.

=== Articles and reviews ===
- Greenberg, Joseph H. (1940). "The decipherment of the 'Ben-Ali Diary': A preliminary statement". Journal of Negro History. 25 (3): 372–375. doi:10.2307/2714801. JSTOR 2714801. S2CID 149671256.
- Greenberg (1941). "Some problems in Hausa phonology". Language. 17 (4): 316–323. doi:10.2307/409283. JSTOR 409283.
- Greenberg, Joseph H. (1947). "Arabic loan-words in Hausa". Word. 3 (1–2): 85–87. doi:10.1080/00437956.1947.11659308.
- Greenberg, Joseph H. (1948). "The classification of African languages". American Anthropologist. 50: 24–30. doi:10.1525/aa.1948.50.1.02a00050.
- "Studies in African linguistic classification: I. Introduction, Niger–Congo family". Southwestern Journal of Anthropology. 5: 79–100. 1949. doi:10.1086/soutjanth.5.2.3628626. S2CID 149333938.
- Greenberg, Joseph H. (1949). "Studies in African linguistic classification: II. The classification of Fulani". Southwestern Journal of Anthropology. 5 (3): 190–98. doi:10.1086/soutjanth.5.3.3628501. S2CID 164123099.
- Greenberg, Joseph H. (1949). "Studies in African linguistic classification: III. The position of Bantu". Southwestern Journal of Anthropology. 5 (4): 309–17. doi:10.1086/soutjanth.5.4.3628591. S2CID 130651394.
- Greenberg (1950). "Studies in African linguistic classification: IV. Hamito-Semitic". Southwestern Journal of Anthropology. 6 (1): 47–63. doi:10.1086/soutjanth.6.1.3628690. JSTOR 3628690. S2CID 163617689.
- Greenberg, Joseph H. (1950). "Studies in African linguistic classification: V. The Eastern Sudanic Family". Southwestern Journal of Anthropology. 6 (2): 143–60. doi:10.1086/soutjanth.6.2.3628639. S2CID 163502465.
- Greenberg, Joseph H. (1950). "Studies in African linguistic classification: VI. The Click languages". Southwestern Journal of Anthropology. 6 (3): 223–37. doi:10.1086/soutjanth.6.3.3628459. S2CID 147343029.
- Greenberg, Joseph H. (1950). "Studies in African linguistic classification: VII. Smaller families; index of languages". Southwestern Journal of Anthropology. 6 (4): 388–98. doi:10.1086/soutjanth.6.4.3628564. S2CID 146929514.
- Greenberg, Joseph H. (1954). "Studies in African linguistic classification: VIII. Further remarks on method; revisions and corrections". Southwestern Journal of Anthropology. 10 (4): 405–15. doi:10.1086/soutjanth.10.4.3628835. S2CID 162901139.
- Greenberg, Joseph H. (1957). "The nature and uses of linguistic typologies". International Journal of American Linguistics. 23 (2): 68–77. doi:10.1086/464395. S2CID 144662912.
- Anthony F.C. Wallace, ed. (1960). "The general classification of Central and South American languages". Selected Papers of the Fifth International Congress of Anthropological and Ethnological Sciences. Philadelphia: University of Pennsylvania Press. pp. 791–4. (Reprinted in Genetic Linguistics, 2005.)
- Greenberg, Joseph H. (1962). "Is the vowel-consonant dichotomy universal?". Word. 18 (1–3): 73–81. doi:10.1080/00437956.1962.11659766.
- Universals of Language. Cambridge: MIT Press. 1963. pp. 58–90. Archived from the original on 2010-09-20. (In second edition of Universals of Language, 1966: pp. 73–113.)
- Greenberg (1966). "Synchronic and diachronic universals in phonology". Language. 42 (2): 508–17. doi:10.2307/411706. JSTOR 411706.
- Greenberg, Joseph H. (1970). "Some generalizations concerning glottalic consonants, especially implosives". International Journal of American Linguistics. 36 (2): 123–145. doi:10.1086/465105. S2CID 143225017.
- Thomas A. Sebeok; et al., eds. (1971). "The Indo-Pacific hypothesis". Current Trends in Linguistics, Volume 8: Linguistics in Oceania. The Hague: Mouton de Gruyter. pp. 807–871. (Reprinted in Genetic Linguistics, 2005.)
- "Numeral classifiers and substantival number: Problems in the genesis of a linguistic type". Working Papers in Language Universals. 9: 1–39. 1972.
- Greenberg (1979). "Rethinking linguistics diachronically". Language. 55 (2): 275–90. doi:10.2307/412585. JSTOR 412585.
- Ralph E. Cooley; Mervin R. Barnes; John A. Dunn, eds. (1979). "The classification of American Indian languages". Papers of the Mid-American Linguistic Conference at Oklahoma. Norman, Oklahoma: University of Oklahoma Interdisciplinary Linguistics Program. pp. 7–22.
- Joseph Ki-Zerbo, ed. (1981). "African linguistic classification". General History of Africa, Volume 1: Methodology and African Prehistory. Berkeley and Los Angeles: University of California Press. pp. 292–308.
- Ivan R. Dihoff, ed. (1983). "Some areal characteristics of African languages". Current Approaches to African Linguistics. Vol. 1. Dordrecht: Foris. pp. 3–21.
- With Christy G. Turner II and Stephen L. Zegura (1985). "Convergence of evidence for peopling of the Americas". Collegium Antropologicum. 9: 33–42.
- With Christy G. Turner II and Stephen L. Zegura (December 1986). "The settlement of the Americas: A comparison of the linguistic, dental, and genetic evidence". Current Anthropology. 27 (5): 477–97. doi:10.1086/203472. S2CID 144209907.
- Greenberg, J. H. (1989). "Classification of American Indian languages: A reply to Campbell". Language. 65 (1): 107–114. doi:10.2307/414844. JSTOR 414844.
- Greenberg, J. H. (1993). "Observations concerning Ringe's 'Calculating the factor of chance in language comparison'". Proceedings of the American Philosophical Society. 137 (1): 79–90. JSTOR 986946.
- "Review of Michael Fortescue: Language Relations across Bering Strait: Reappraising the Archaeological and Linguistic Evidence". Review of Archaeology. 21 (2): 23–24. 2000.

== Bibliography ==
- Blench, Roger. 1995. "Is Niger–Congo simply a branch of Nilo-Saharan?" In Fifth Nilo-Saharan Linguistics Colloquium, Nice, 24–29 August 1992: Proceedings, edited by Robert Nicolaï and Franz Rottland. Cologne: Köppe Verlag, pp. 36–49.
- Campbell, Lyle (1986). "Comment on Greenberg, Turner, and Zegura". Current Anthropology. 27: 488. doi:10.1086/203472. S2CID 144209907.
- Campbell, Lyle. 1997. American Indian Languages: The Historical Linguistics of Native America. New York: Oxford University Press. ISBN 0-19-509427-1.
- Campbell, Lyle. 2001. "Beyond the comparative method." In Historical Linguistics 2001: Selected Papers from the 15th International Conference on Historical Linguistics, Melbourne, 13–17 August 2001, edited by Barry J. Blake, Kate Burridge, and Jo Taylor.
- Diamond, Jared. 1997. Guns, Germs and Steel: The Fates of Human Societies. New York: Norton. ISBN 0-393-03891-2.
- Gregersen, Edgar (1972). "Kongo-Saharan". Journal of African Languages. 11 (1): 69–89.
- Mairal, Ricardo and Juana Gil. 2006. Linguistic Universals. Cambridge–NY: Cambridge University Press. ISBN 978-0-521-54552-5.
- Ringe, Donald A. (1993). "A reply to Professor Greenberg". Proceedings of the American Philosophical Society. 137: 91–109.
- Ross, Malcolm. 2005. "Pronouns as a preliminary diagnostic for grouping Papuan languages." In Papuan Pasts: Cultural, Linguistic and Biological Histories of Papuan-speaking Peoples, edited by Andrew Pawley, Robert Attenborough, Robin Hide, and Jack Golson. Canberra: Pacific Linguistics, pp. 15–66.
- Wurm, Stephen A. 1982. The Papuan Languages of Oceania. Tübingen: Gunter Narr.

== See also ==
- Linguistic universal
- Moscow School of Comparative Linguistics
- Monogenesis (linguistics)
- Nostratic languages
