= Boivin =

Boivin (French: from bois vin "(you) drink wine" (from the Old French verb boire "to drink" + vin "wine") used as a nickname for a (heavy) drinker) is a surname from France. Boivin is a combination of the French words bois (verb boire "to drink") and vin, which mean "drink" and "wine" respectively. The surname refers to someone who drinks (too much) wine.

== Persons in France ==
- François de Boivin (died 1618), French chronicler
- Jean-Marc Boivin (1951–1990), French mountaineer and BASE jumper born in Dijon
- Jean Boivin the Younger or Jean Boivin de Villeneuve (1663–?), French writer, scholar and translator
- Jeanne Poiret Boivin (1871–1959), French jewelry designer
- Louis Boivin (1649–1724), member of the Academy of inscriptions, brother of Jean
- Marie Boivin (1773–1841), French midwife, inventor, and obstetrics writer
- Michel Boivin, French historian and anthropologist
- Olivier Boivin (born 1985), French sprint canoer

== Persons in Canada ==
- Arthur Boivin (died 1952), Canadian politician from Manitoba
- Claude Boivin (born 1970), Canadian ice hockey player
- François Boivin (born 1982), Canadian snowboarder
- Françoise Boivin (born 1960), Canadian politician
- Georges Henri Boivin (1882–1926), Canadian politician
- Guillaume Boivin (born 1989), Canadian cyclist
- Leo Boivin (1931–2021), Canadian ice hockey player
- Nicole Boivin (born 1970), Canadian archaeological scientist
- Pierre Boivin (born 1953), French Canadian businessman
- Pierre-Horace Boivin (1905–1994), Canadian politician
- Roch Boivin (1912–1979), Canadian politician

== Persons in United States ==
- Harry D. Boivin (1904–1999), American lawyer and politician
- Joseph Boivin, co-founder, first President of St.Mary's Bank, America's first credit union
