= Species translocation =

Human relocation of plants or animals

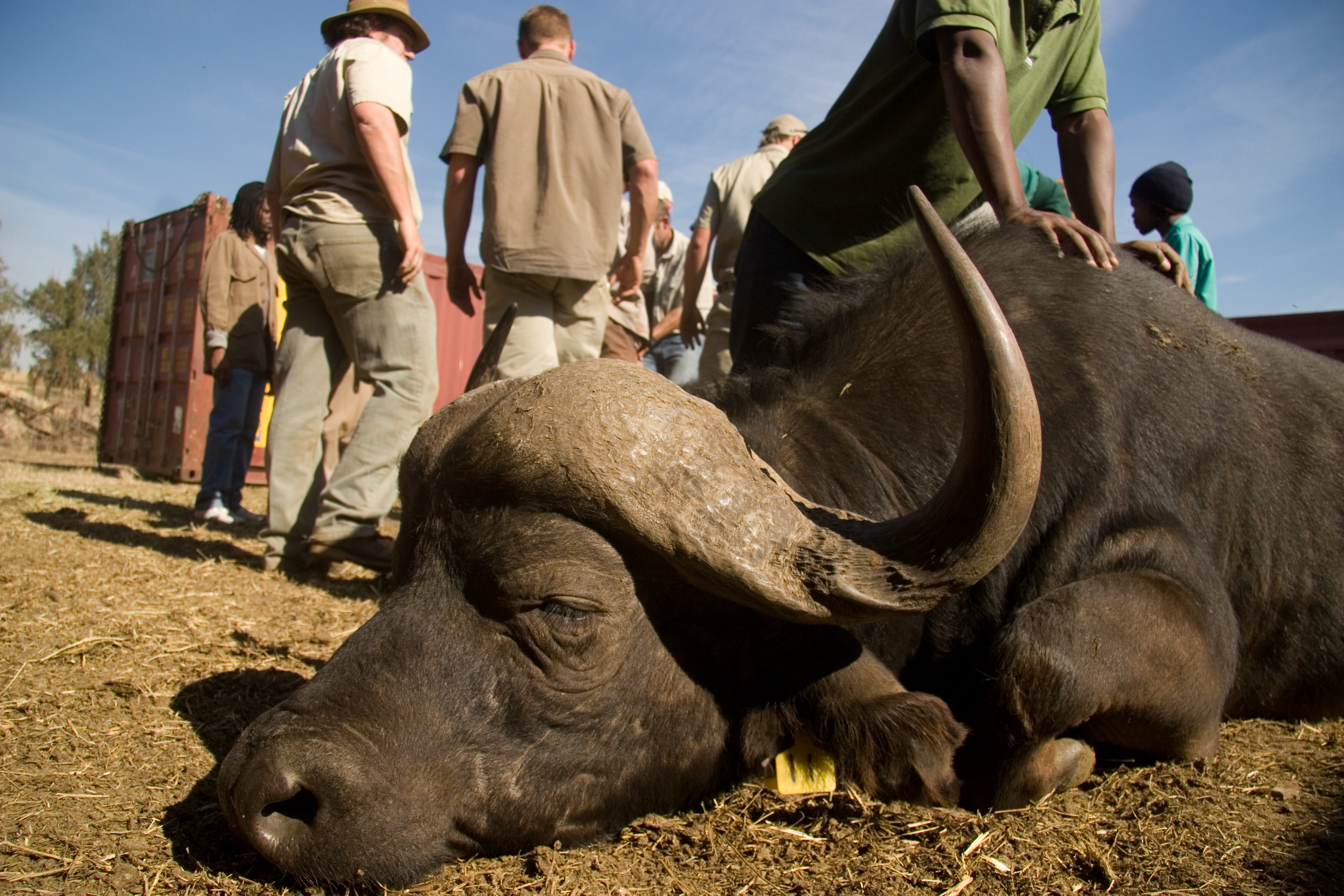
Cape buffalo being translocated to a private game reserve in South Africa.

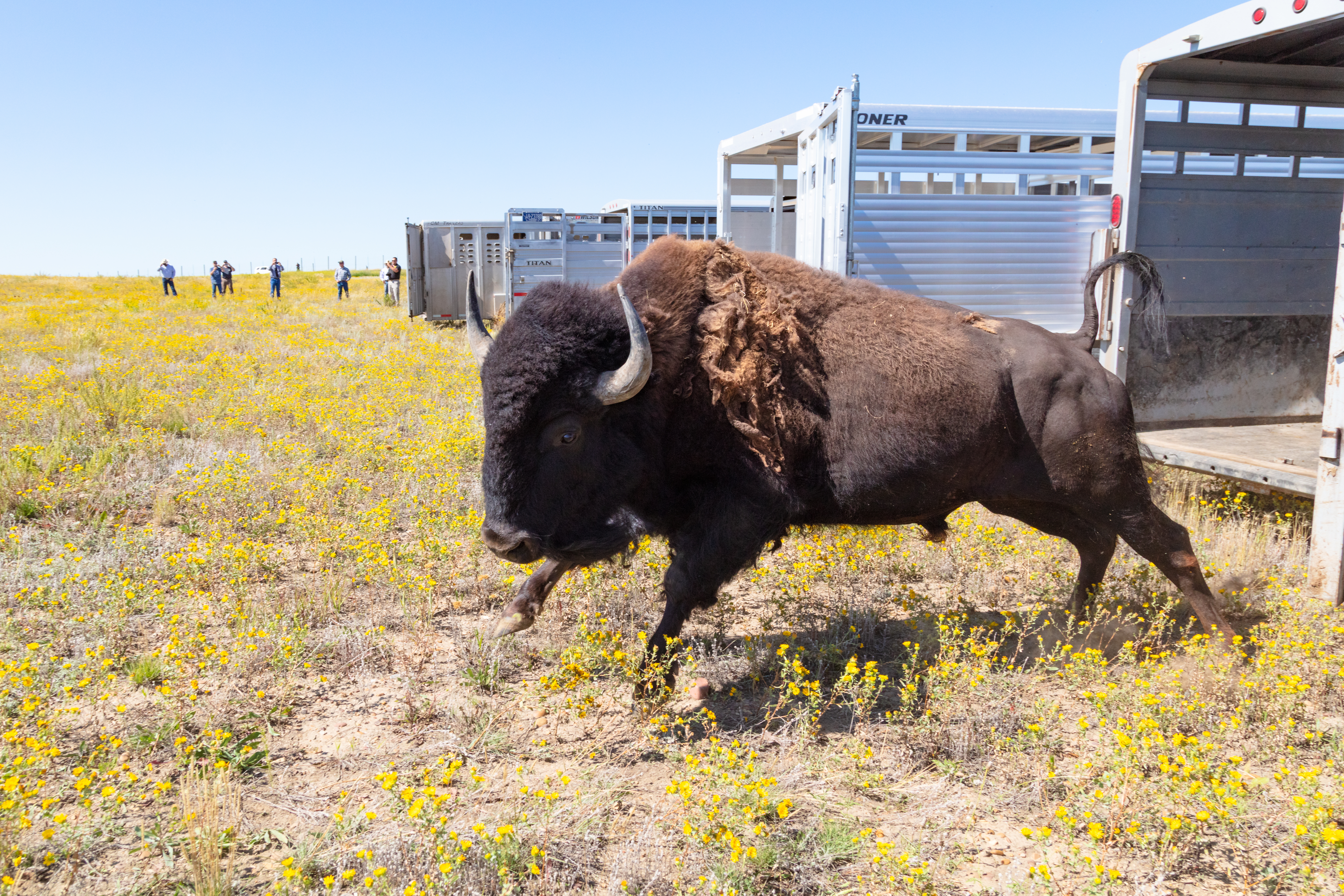
A bison from Yellowstone Park being released in Fort Peck Indian Reservation

Translocation is the human action of moving an organism from one area and releasing it in another. In terms of wildlife conservation, its objective is to improve the conservation status of the translocated organism or to restore the function and processes of the ecosystem the organism is entering.

Two overarching goals of translocation are population restoration and conservation introduction. Population restoration includes reinforcing existing populations and reintroducing populations to areas where they have disappeared. Conservation introduction involves assisted colonization of organisms in entirely new areas, and ecological replacement of organisms to new areas to fulfill a vacant role in the ecosystem.

The International Union for the Conservation of Nature (IUCN) catalogs translocation projects and creates extensive guidelines for their design and execution around the globe.

== Overview ==
Translocation can be an effective management strategy and important topic in conservation biology, but despite their popularity, translocations are a high‐cost endeavor with a history of failures. It may decrease the risk of extinction by increasing the range of a species, augmenting the numbers in a critical population, or establishing new populations. Translocation may also improve the level of biodiversity in the ecosystem.

Translocation may be expensive and is often subject to public scrutiny, particularly when the species involved is charismatic or perceived as dangerous (for example wolf reintroduction). Translocation as a tool is used to reduce the risk of a catastrophe to a species with a single population, to improve genetic heterogeneity of separated populations of a species, to aid the natural recovery of a species or re-establish a species where barriers might prevent it from doing so naturally. It is also used to move ecological features out of the way of development.

Several critically endangered plant species in the southwestern Western Australia have either been considered for translocation or trialled. Grevillea scapigera is one such case, threatened by rabbits, dieback and degraded habitat. The rarest marsupial in the world, Gilbert's potoroo, has been successfully translocated to remote islands in Western Australia as "insurance populations".

Translocation is a traditional, if rarely used, conservation tool. However, in this century of rapid climate change it has recently been reframed as assisted migration of narrowly endemic, critically endangered species that are already experiencing (or soon expected to experience) climate change beyond their levels of tolerance. Two examples of critically endangered relict species for which assisted migration projects are already underway are the western swamp tortoise of Australia and a subcanopy conifer tree in the United States called Florida torreya.

== Types ==
=== Inadvertent ===
In the field of nature conservation, "translocation" refers to deliberate reloation of animals. Archaeologists, paleontologists, and some biologists use the word to mean all transportation, including unindentional. The word is commonly used for movement of any species, in any context, when discussing prehstoric human migrations.

=== Population restoration ===
==== Reinforcement ====
Reinforcement is the deliberate introduction and integration of an organism into an area where its species is already established. This mode of translocation is implemented in populations whose numbers have dropped below critical levels, become dangerously inbred, or who need artificial immigration to maintain genetic diversity. Before enacting reinforcement of a population, the root cause of the population decline should be addressed, allowing for the effort to not go to waste. Further notable considerations include assessing the capacity of the environment to sustain the desired population, and assuring translocated individuals have a diverse genetic makeup and are from a similar climatic or ecological area. Benefits of reinforcement include an increase in genetic diversity, increased populations sizes, and the reduction of Allee effect. Unfortunately, reinforcement also comes with a range of detrimental effects, which have been found through research in recent years. Some concerns specifically involve behavior and morphology changes in the population. Behavioral changes include reduced anti-predator responses, high aggression in resource competition, reduced breeding success, and difficulty finding successful habitat during dispersal. Morphological changes include altered dental health plus digestion struggle due to non-captive diets, and decreased defenses against predators. Along with these changes, the spread of disease poses additional problems. As captive individuals start breeding with wild individuals, genes which are unable to resist wild diseases might spread through the population, leading to large mortality when diseases arise.

==== Reintroduction ====
Reintroduction is the intentional process of reinstating an organism into an ecosystem previously occupied by that species. Individuals who are reintroduced can be caught from the wild and translocated to the new area or can come from captive breeding programs in zoos, wildlife sanctuaries, and similar organizations. The purpose of reintroduction is to create a free-ranging, viable, and reproductively sustainable population which will help restore its environment. Multiple challenges have arisen with reintroductions, mainly concerning genetics and life history traits. Research assessing these concerns of reintroduction tend to primarily focus on genetics. The concern involving genetics revolves around reintroduced individuals not having locally selected traits, which the extinct population most likely had. In regards to life history traits, most reintroduced species are endangered, and knowledge about the life history traits of endangered species tends to be limited. Knowing when the species is sexually mature, how many offspring they will have, their average lifespan, and more, are vital to the success of these programs. Oftentimes the effectiveness of reintroductions are also questioned due to the lack of these considerations and neglected post release monitoring.

=== Conservation introduction ===
==== Assisted colonization ====
Assisted colonization is the process of deliberately releasing endangered organism beyond its native habitat in order to prevent the extinction of its species. This process of creating “insurance populations” is primarily used when the species faces current or future threats and prevention of them or protection from them is not deemed feasible. One of the primary goals of such populations is to hold onto aspects of the populations that would be lost if captured for captive breeding. One of the main aspects lost within those populations is genetic diversity as selective pressures are no longer present. This form of translocation can move organisms to areas close to their native range or move them far distances to areas separated by non-habitats. There are many examples of assisted colonization proving to be successful, but there are voices challenging the effectiveness of this process, highlighting potential unintended consequences. The introduction of these species can alter ecosystem process, ecological interactions between organisms, decrease biodiversity, cause hybridization, and in some cases even cause other species to go extinct.

==== Ecological replacement ====
Ecological Replacement is the process of deliberately releasing organisms beyond their native habitat, to fulfil an ecological function which has been vacated in an environment. If a species integral to an ecosystem has been lost due to extinction, a related species will be placed to fulfil the same role and re-establish the ecosystem function. These typically range from a related sub-species to another species within the same genus. An example of such is the ecological services herbivores provide. Besides consuming plants, herbivores also spread seeds and provide disturbances for new plants to grow as seen with the Galápagos Tortoises on Pinta Island. If a primary herbivore is lost, the ecosystem would greatly suffer as the consumed plants would take over due to being unregulated. The process of ecological replacement is used as a form of conservation to maintain healthy ecosystems, but unintended ecological replacement can also occur through invasive species. If an invasive organism is introduced to an area which contains a closely related species, the invasive organism can ecologically take over the role of the native species.

=== Non-conservation oriented ===
==== Nuisance removal ====
Nuisance Removals involve the translocation of individuals deemed as nuisance after coming into conflict with humans in a particular area. As the human population continues to grow and development expands into previous wild areas, human-animal conflicts will continue to increase. These conflicts range from herbivores consuming plants in urban landscapes and agriculture, to carnivores hunting pets, livestock, or attacking humans. Previous methods of controlling such conflicts was through lethal control of the nuisance animals, but practices have been shifting to translocations. Many problems have arrived with such translocations as there is a lack of scientific security as these translocations do not occur for conservation goals, but for human needs instead.

==== Introductions ====
Introductions involve the purposeful or accidental translocation of species beyond their native range. After an introduction occurs, the animal is considered a non-native species in that area. If this new species does not harm its new environment, it will remain a non-native species, but once the introduced species begins to enact damage on the natural functions of the ecosystem, it becomes classified as an invasive species. When species are purposely introduced into an area, there can be a multitude of motivations behind them. A common purpose is for pest control in human areas and as a way to protect crops. Another common introduction of species is through the pet trade. As anything from reptiles, mammals, birds, and amphibians are owned as pets, many species have been introduced after escaping or being released by owners. Other reasons include economic gain from having a natural resource grown or cultivated in a new area, or for decorative displays. Unintentional introductions can also occur though a variety of different means, but many result from global shipping routes. Aquatic species are a common example as they are commonly transported with ship ballast water and from recreational boat hull fouling communities.

== Trends ==
Percentage of translocated animals by class (Source:Griffith et al. 1993)

Between 1973 and 1989 an estimated 515 translocations occurred per year in the United States, Canada, New Zealand and Australia. The majority were conducted in the United States. Birds were the most frequently translocated, followed by threatened and endangered species, then non-game species. Of the 261 translocations in the United States reported wild species were most frequently translocated, and the greatest number occurred in the Southeast.

== Success and failure ==
Species translocation can vary greatly across taxa. For instance, bird and mammal translocations have a high success rate, while amphibian and reptile translocations have a low success rate. Successful translocations are characterized by moving a large number of individuals, using a wild population as the source of the translocated individuals, and removing the problems which caused their decline within the area they are being translocated. The translocation of 254 black bears to the Ozark Mountains in Arkansas resulted in more than 2,500 individuals 11 years later and has been seen as one of the most successful translocations in order Carnivora. Another example of successful translocation is the gray wolf translocation in Yellowstone National Park.

Often, when conducting translocation programs, differences in specific habitat types between the source and release sites are not evaluated as long as the release site contains suitable habitat for the species. Translocations could be especially damaging to endangered species citing the failed attempt of Bufo hemiophys baxteri in Wyoming and B. boreas in the Southern Rocky Mountains. For species that have declined over large areas and long periods of time translocations are of little use. Maintaining a large and widely dispersed population of amphibians and other species is the most important aspect of maintaining regional diversity and translocation should only be attempted when a suitable unoccupied habitat exists. Among plants, the translocation of Narcissus cavanillesii during the construction of the largest European dam (Alqueva dam) is considered one of the best known examples of a successful translocation in plants.

== Historical ==
Beginning in the Late Pleistocene, human activity altered the distributions of various species around the globe, spanning most taxonomic groups. Major reorganization of species distributions took place at all scales: local, regional, and intercontinental The chronological record shows a generally accelerating trend – but the rate of change was sporadic and fluctuating The variety of plant and species that were introduced and cultivated was very broad, and included domesticated, wild, and pathogenic species. The archaeologist Patrick Vinton Kirch wrote: "...the variety of animals moved by human colonists is 'astonishing,' including for example lice, beetles, fleas, mites, land snails, geckos, rats, mice, birds, deer, fox, and wolf. Although some translocations were purposeful, many others appear to have been inadvertent."

The archaeologists Nicole Boivin and Jon Erlandson identified four phases of human activity that played a major role in translocation of species. (Note: The four phases were not exhaustive, and did not include the most ancient human impacts; they were selected because they demonstrated important trends and patterns.) The first phase was the migration of humans around the world, from about 195,000 to 12,000 years ago. The second phase was the development of agriculture and pastoralism, from roughly 11,700 to 1,000 years ago. The third phase was the colonization of islands (about 10,600 to 1,000 years ago) The final phase was urbanization and the creation of trade networks, from roughly 3,000 years ago to the modern era.

== Examples ==
=== North America ===
- American bison (Bison bison) populations originally sat around 60 million individuals until humans brought their numbers to 835 individuals in 1889. This decline led to increased conservation efforts, including translocation of captive bred individuals. These bison were translocated to Oklahoma, South Dakota, Nebraska, and Montana which have led to healthy and growing populations today.
- Bald eagles (Haliaeetus leucocephalus) have been a part of a multitude of translocation programs. One program involved capturing a total of 218 nestlings between 1981 and 1987 from southeast Alaska and releasing them in New York, Indiana Tennessee, Missouri, and North Carolina.
- Bighorn sheep (Ovis canadensis) populations dropped by more than 95% due to unregulated harvest, habitat loss, habitat alteration, disease, and more. An area of specific success is in Arizona with reintroductions taking off in 1979 increasing their population from 1,400 to 3,200 in 1994.
- Black bears (Ursus americanus) have been translocated to the Interior Highlands in Arkansas where they were previously found. Across 11 years 254 individuals were taken from Minnesota and released. Now in Oklahoma, Missouri, and Arkansas there are greater than 2,500 individuals as of 1994.
- Black-footed ferret (Mustela nigripes) last known wild population in Wyoming became nearly extinct in the mid-1980s. 18 individuals were removed and have been captive bred since 1991 for reintroduction. After rigorous efforts over the years, new populations have been re-established in South Dakota.
- California condor (Gymnogyps californianus) populations declined to around 22 individuals by 1982. Thanks to conservation efforts, all remaining condors were captured and taken into captivity for breeding. Following this effort in 1992, individuals began to be re-released into the areas their species use to roam leading to increased population numbers.
- Elk (Cervus canadensi), specifically eastern elk (Cervus canadensis canadensis) were native to the eastern United States in Kentucky, Tennessee, and western North Carolina. Their extirpation from these areas came in 1885 after overharvesting and habitat loss. Interest arose to bring back this extinct population, and in the early 2000s successful translocations occurred from Elk Island National Park to establish a population in Tennessee and North Carolina.
- Gray wolves (Canis lupus) had a population established on Isle Royale National Park in Lake Superior, which dropped to two individuals in 2017. This has led to an unmitigated growth in its moose population (Alces alces) and a call for translocation to restart the Isle Royale wolf population. Individuals were taken from the Great Lakes region in places like Minnesota, Ontario, and Michigan.
- Island foxes (Urocyon littoralis) are a species of fox that only live on the Channel Islands off the cost of Southern California, with a subspecies occupying each island. As of the 1990s populations were stable on all islands until a surprise drop in survival rates cause by invasive predators and canine distemper. Captive breeding programs were started to help increase their numbers while efforts began to protect the remaining individuals from the current threats. In 2001 pups from captive breeding program began to be translocated back into the wild.
- Kemp's ridley sea turtle (Lepidochelys kempii) was listed as endangered in 1970 and ongoing conservation efforts have been increasing their numbers since. Methods include the translocation of nets to captive hatcheries, and movement of nests to protected areas on beaches. Other individuals who are rescued for various reasons are rehabilitated and translocated to new areas.
- Loggerhead sea turtle (Caretta caretta) conservation efforts have created many different strategies to increase their population numbers. One method includes the translocation of their nests to safer parts of a beach or to hatcheries. This process allows for survival rates of nests to increase due to predators, poachers, floods, and beach erosion no longer effecting the survival of the hatchlings.
- North American beaver (Castor canadensis) populations declined due to habitat destruction and intensive trapping for fur in the 19th century. Translocation of this species has been used as a method to restore their populations and the stream environments that they engineer.
- North American river otter (Lontra canadensis) populations declined in the United States and Canada due to habitat destruction, overexploitation, and pollution. In 1989 the North Carolina River Otter Restoration Project translocated 333 individuals from stable populations to 11 areas in the western portion of the state.
- Red wolves (Canis rufus), like many other species of wolves has suffered over the years from intense hunting from humans. In 1973 the United States listed it on the Endangered Species Act, allowing for recovery of the species to begin. Through captive breeding programs with zoological associations, reintroductions began in September 1987 in North Carolina. Through rigorous efforts successful reproduction and colonization were recorded in North Carolina for the first time in decades.
- Swift foxes (Vulpes velox) historically covered a vast range of the Dakota's, Montana, Nebraska, Kansas, New Mexico, Texas, Alberta, Saskatchewan, and more. Swift fox populations greatly declined due to hunting, rodent control programs, and more. Reintroductions began in 1983 in Canada and efforts have spread to restore them to their original native states.
- White-tailed deer (Odocoileus virginianus) have been translocated for conservation purposes, but have also been translocated as a method of removal from metropolitan environment's. This is mainly fueled by a negative public perception of killing deer, but doubles as a way to increase their numbers in areas where they are decreasing.
- Wild turkey (Meleagris gallapovo) populations suffered from habitat loss and overharvesting in the 1800s and 1900s. To restore populations turkeys were translocated from remaining populations to former areas. In the 1950s only around 200,000 individuals were in the southern United States, but by 1999 there were over 2 million.

=== South America ===
- Golden lion tamarins (Leontopithecus rosalia) are still threatened with extinction, but in 1964 they were almost there with fewer than 400 individuals in the wild. Native to the Atlantic Forest, Rio de Janeiro State, and Brazil, conservation programs began in 1981 to reintroduce and translocate individuals from isolated groups to increase population numbers.
- The Pinta Island tortoise (Chelonoidis abingdonii) was a species of Galápagos tortoises that previously occupied Pinta Island in Ecuador. After going extinct, its ecological role was left vacant. This lead conservationists to ecologically replace them with Galápagos Giant Tortoises. Initially, 39 nonreproductive adults were introduced in May 2010 to see how two major phenotypes (domed and saddleback) would adapt to the new environment.

=== Europe ===
- Cirl bunting (Emberiza cirlus) is a rare species of bird whose range in England was restricted to South Devon. The capturing of around 80 free-living chicks occurred each year, allowing for a captive rearing program to increase their survival success. Then the individuals would be reintroduced back into the wild in Cornwall England.
- Eurasian beaver (Castor fiber) populations dwindled after intense overhunting, leaving 5 small populations remaining around Europe. This has led to the implementation of translocation projects around Europe to establish these beavers to their native ranges. Specifically in the Netherlands, where the last native beaver died in 1826, beavers have been reintroduced.
- European bison (Bison bonasus) suffered major population declines after expansion of human activities like habitat destruction, unregulated hunting, and more. By the start of the 20th century they were extinct in the wild with few remaining in captivity. Thanks to intensive conservations efforts they are being reintroduced back into their native ranges in the wild, including countries like the Czech Republic.
- European mink (Mustela lutreola) is one of the most endangered mammal species, as its population drastically falls. Threats like habitat loss/fragmentation, overhunting, and the spread of the invasive American Mink (Neovison vison) have reduced their numbers over the years. Only around 3% of its former range is still occupied with around 5000 individuals in total. Thanks to conservations efforts, populations have been established in Estonia and Germany.
- Short-haired bumblebee (Bombus subterraneus) populations declined after massive habitat loss and resource depletion in the United Kingdom. Around 100 queens were captured each year from the wild from 2012–2015 to be translocated to a designated release sight.

=== Africa ===
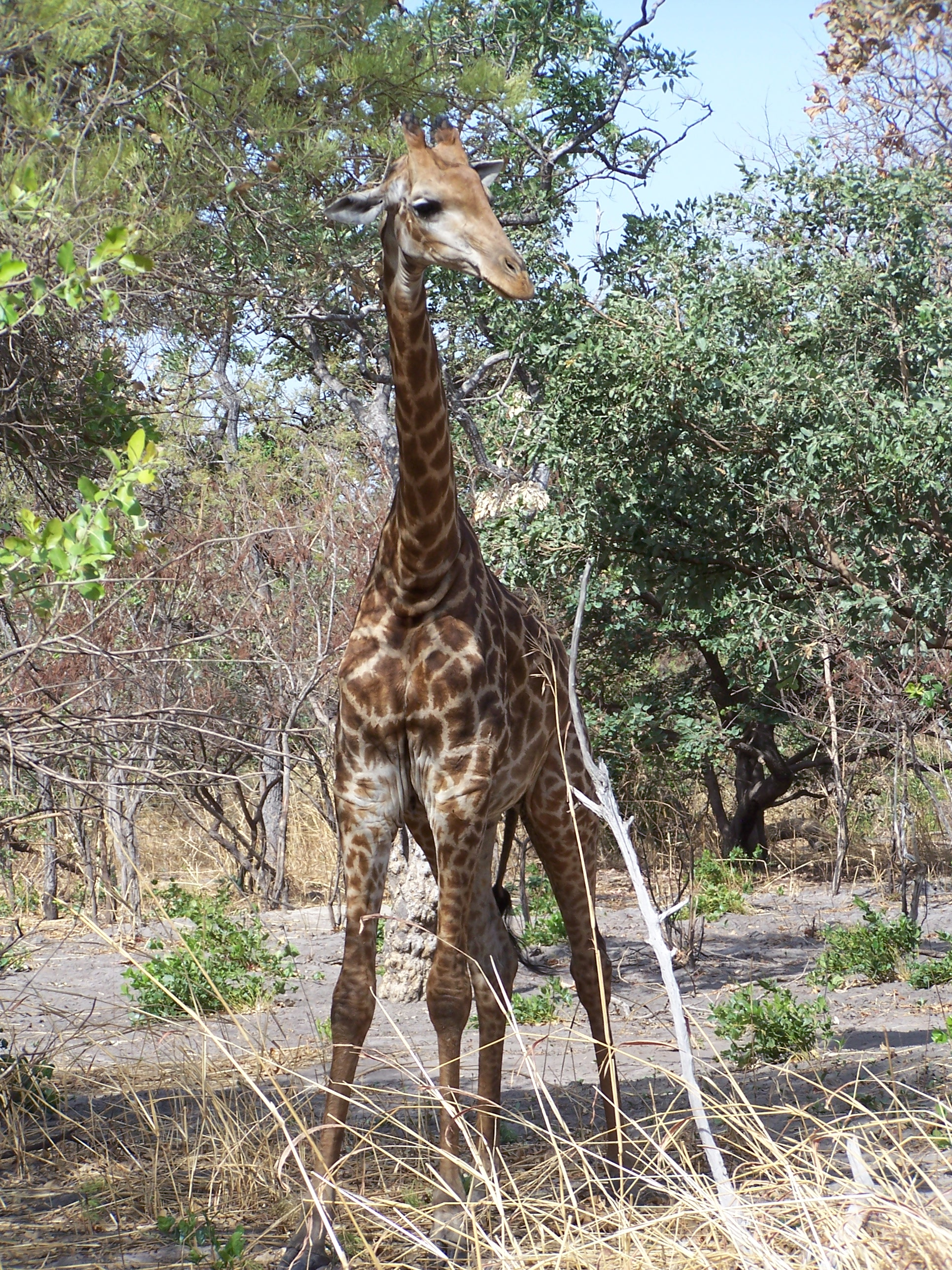
South African giraffe translocated to Senegal

- African elephants (Loxodonta africana) have increasingly become a pest due to increased human-elephant conflict as humans move further into their habitat. One solution to the problem is translocating elephants as a way to reduce conflict without decreasing their vulnerable numbers. In 2005, 150 elephants were translocated in Kenya.
- South African giraffes (Giraffa camelopardalis giraffa) were translocated to Senegal, where giraffes had been extirpated by hunting and habitat loss.
- Southern white rhino (Ceratotherium simum simum) and Southern-Central Black rhino (Diceros bicornis minor) live in populations on private and public reserves, which are prone to local extinctions. Efforts to translocate individuals have been enacted to increase their wild populations in areas like the Okavango Delta in Botswana.

=== Asia ===
- Siberian tigers (Panthera tigris altaica), like many other large carnivores, come into conflict with growing human areas. In Russian Far East, Amur tigers have been traditionally killed to prevent such attacks. A solution to help maintain tiger numbers and reduce conflict has been translocation of tigers to areas where conflict with humans won't be as common.
- The final wild Arabian oryx (Oryx leucory) was killed around 1972 after being a staple creature in the Arab world for hundreds of years. With few remaining in captivity an intensive program dubbed 'Operation Oryx' began with captive breeding and reintroduction of the species in Oman in 1982.

=== Australia ===
- Tiger snakes (Notechis scutatus) are a common species of snake that Australians have removed from their land due to their venomous threat. One method of removal involves translocation areas outside of residential zones. This occurs with hundreds of snakes each year around the greater Melbourne, Victoria area.
- Noisy miners (Manorina melanocephala) are an aggressive species of honey eaters who commonly don't allow other species to their areas. As a result, the increase in their populations have excluded other species of honey eater and insectivores birds. This has caused eucalyptus diebacks from insects, as there are no birds to eat them. In response, translocations of Noisy Miners has been implemented to disperse their population and allow for other bird species to move in who will regulate insect numbers.
- The Woylie (Bettongia penicillata) has been translocated more than any other marsupial through conservation efforts to save its species. This has occurred across 61 sites in Australia with more than 3,400 individuals. Woylies have had abundant success as a result of their translocations, and have been considered a template for other marsupial translocations.

== Sources ==
- Boivin, Nicole L.; et al. (2016). "Ecological Consequences of Human Niche Construction: Examining Long-Term Anthropogenic Shaping of Global Species Distributions". PNAS. 113 (23): 6388–6396. doi:10.1073/pnas.1525200113. PMC 4988612.
- Grayson, Donald K.; et al. (2001). "The Archaeological Record of Human Impacts on Animal Populations". Journal of World Prehistory. 15 (1). Springer Nature: 1–68. doi:10.1023/A:1011165119141. ISSN 0892-7537.
- Kirch, Patrick (2005). "Archaeology and Global Change: The Holocene Record". Annual Review of Environment and Resources. 30: 409–440. doi:10.1146/annurev.energy.29.102403.140700. ISSN 1543-5938.
