= Granby Zoo =

Zoo in Canada

Le Zoo de Granby Granby Zoo
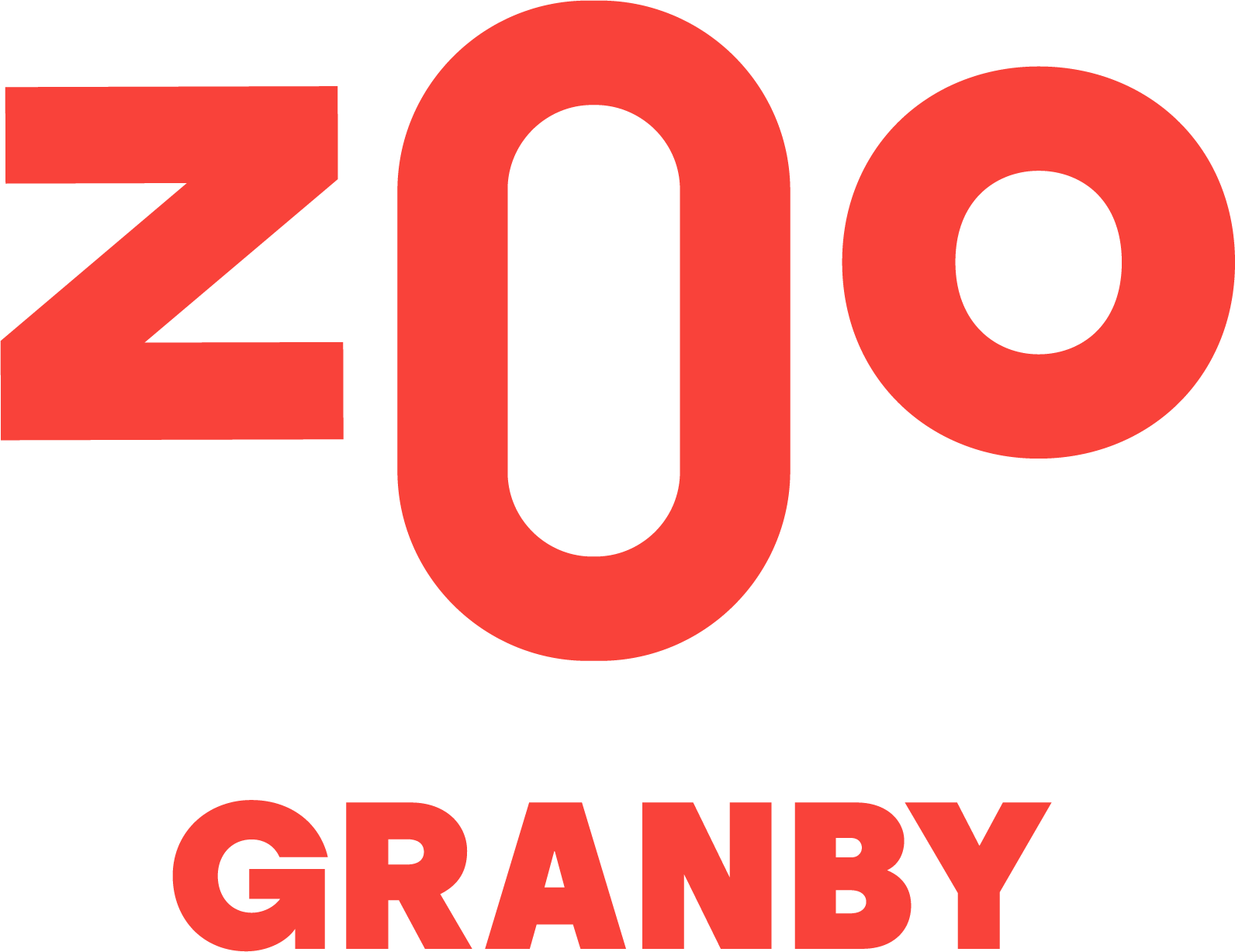
- Interactive map of Le Zoo de Granby; Granby Zoo
- Date opened: 1953
- Location: boulevard David Bouchard Nord; Granby, Quebec, Canada
- No. of animals: 1,000
- No. of species: 200
- Memberships: WAZA, AZA
- Website: zoodegranby.com

The Granby Zoo (French: Le Zoo de Granby) is a zoo in Granby, Quebec, and is one of Quebec's major tourist attractions.

It was founded in 1953 by the mayor of Granby at the time, Pierre-Horace Boivin. There are currently more than 1,800 different animals representing 230 species. The zoo has 516,000 visitors per year and contains animals from Africa, Asia, South America, and Oceania. Adjacent to the zoo is the Amazoo water park. The zoo also has an amusement park called "Parc Johnny Test Collection" which is named after the Johnny Test animated television series.

== Exhibits and animals ==
=== Asia ===
The Asia section is home to a variety of animals. The Red panda, Siberian tiger, Yak, Przewalski's horse, Bactrian camel, and Japanese macaque are a select few of the Asia section's variety of animals. They also boast a geodesic dome designed by the same architect as Montreal's famous Biosphere.

=== Oceania ===
The Oceania section has a selection of different habitats, such as an aquarium and Australian Safari. Creatures include the Eastern Kangaroo, Cownose ray, Blacktip Reef Shark, Emu, Green Sea Turtle, Bennett's Wallaby, Barn Owl, Black Swan, Moon Jellyfish, and Rainbow Lorikeet. The aquarium allows visitors to touch the stingrays. The Australian Safari allows visitors to encounter a kangaroo crossing the path and to feed the lorikeets.

=== South America ===
Animals include Andean condors, Jaguars, Boas, and Alligators.

== 2024 labour dispute ==
Of the zoo's 830 employees, 130 are unionized. Their collective agreement expired on 31 December 2023. After negotiations stalled, the union adopted a ten-day strike mandate, and three strike days took place in July 2024.

On 22 July, management made a final offer, which was rejected. On 26 July, the union voted 91% in favour of an unlimited general strike but did not launch it. On 29 July, the zoo declared a lockout, and the facility remained open to visitors.

During the summer, the zoo received 446,000 visitors, about 4,000 fewer than in 2023, below the target of 475,000.

Talks improved in November 2024, with both sides noting progress.

After 73 bargaining sessions, including 64 with a Ministry of Labour representative, a tentative agreement was reached on 20 February 2025 and approved by 99% of members.

== Gallery ==
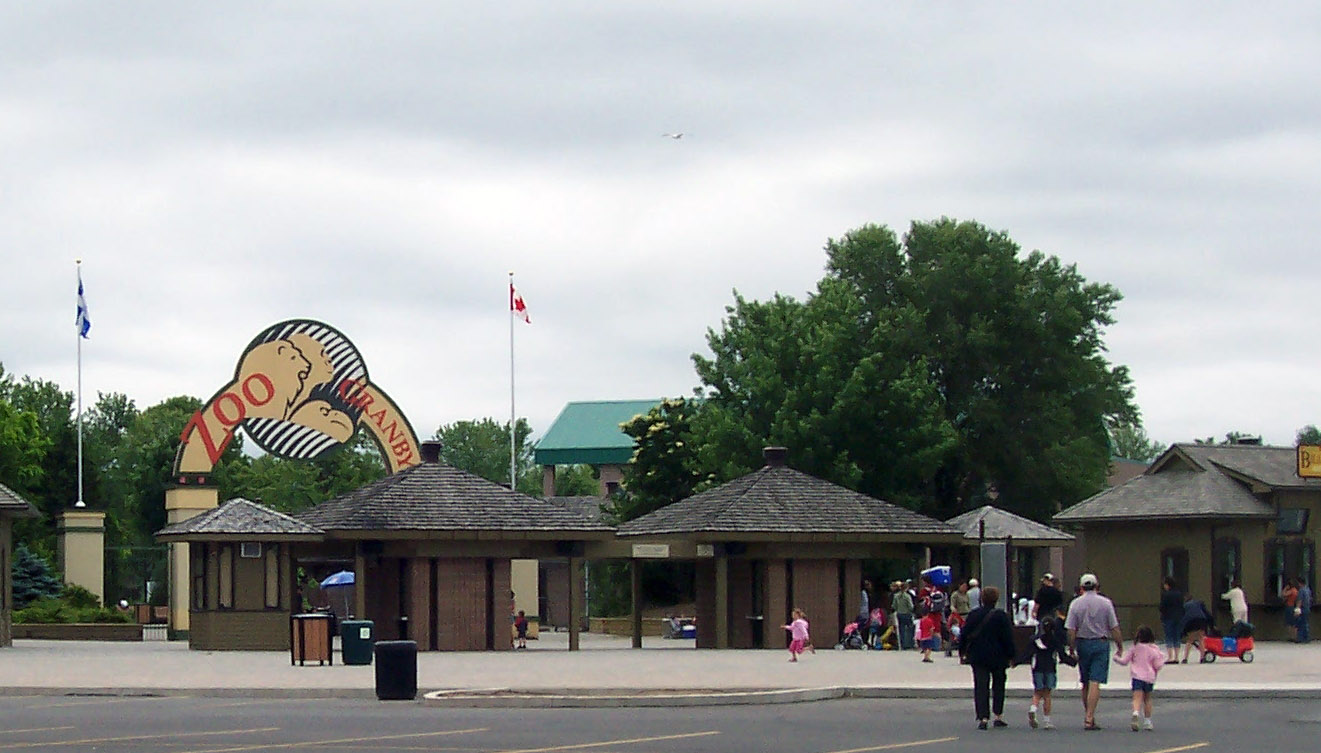
The entrance to the Granby Zoo

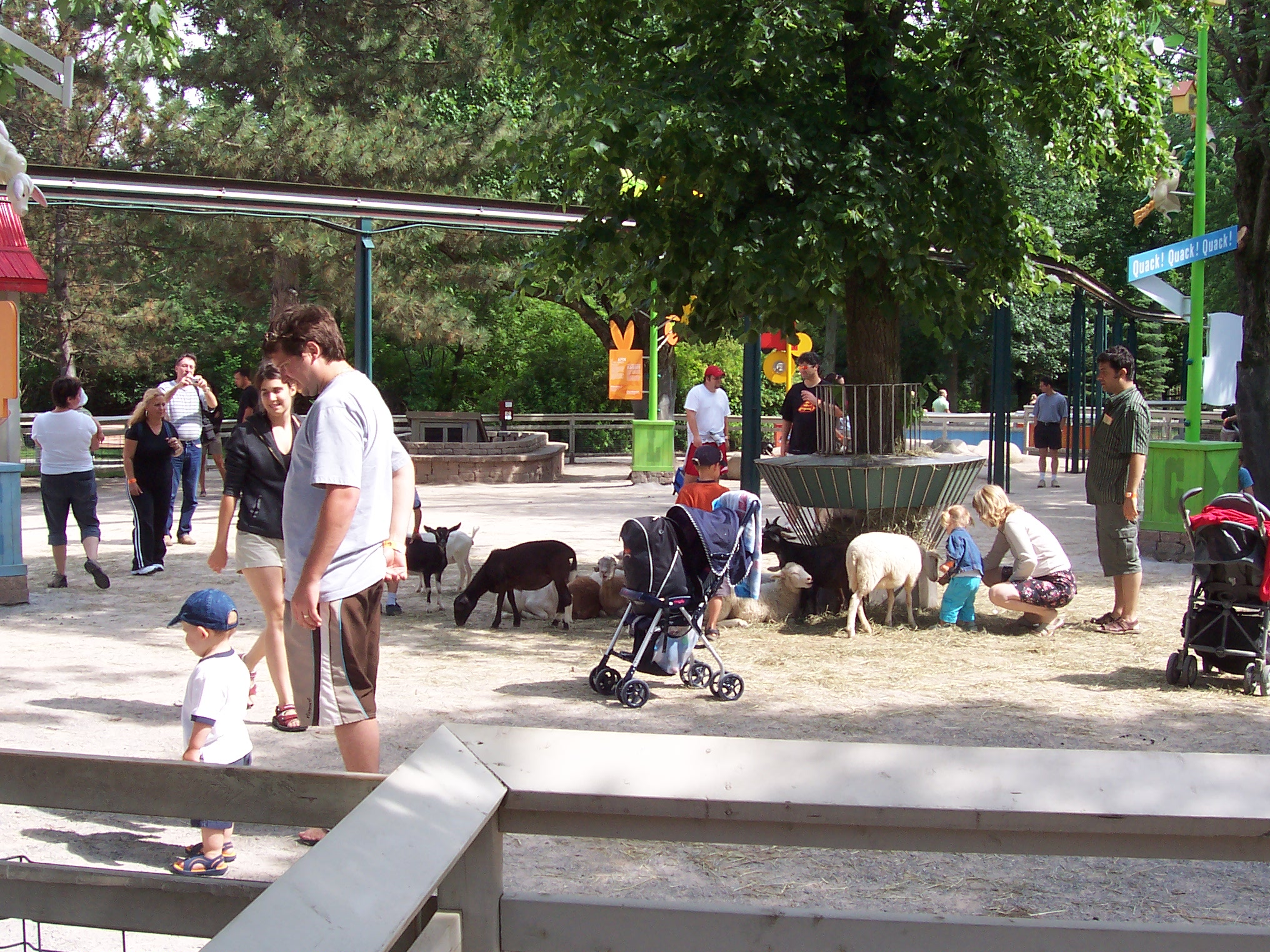
Petting Zoo

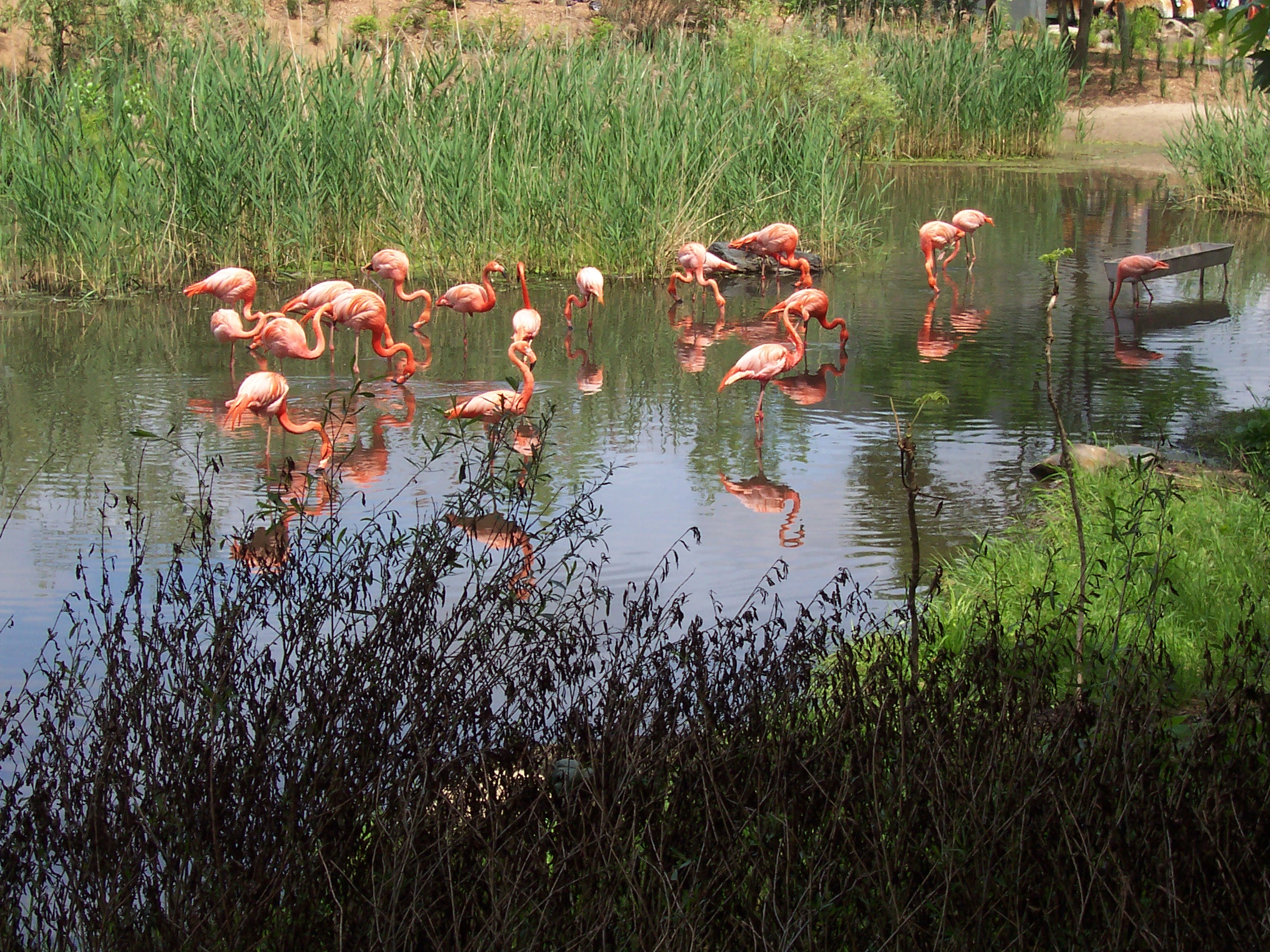
Flamingos

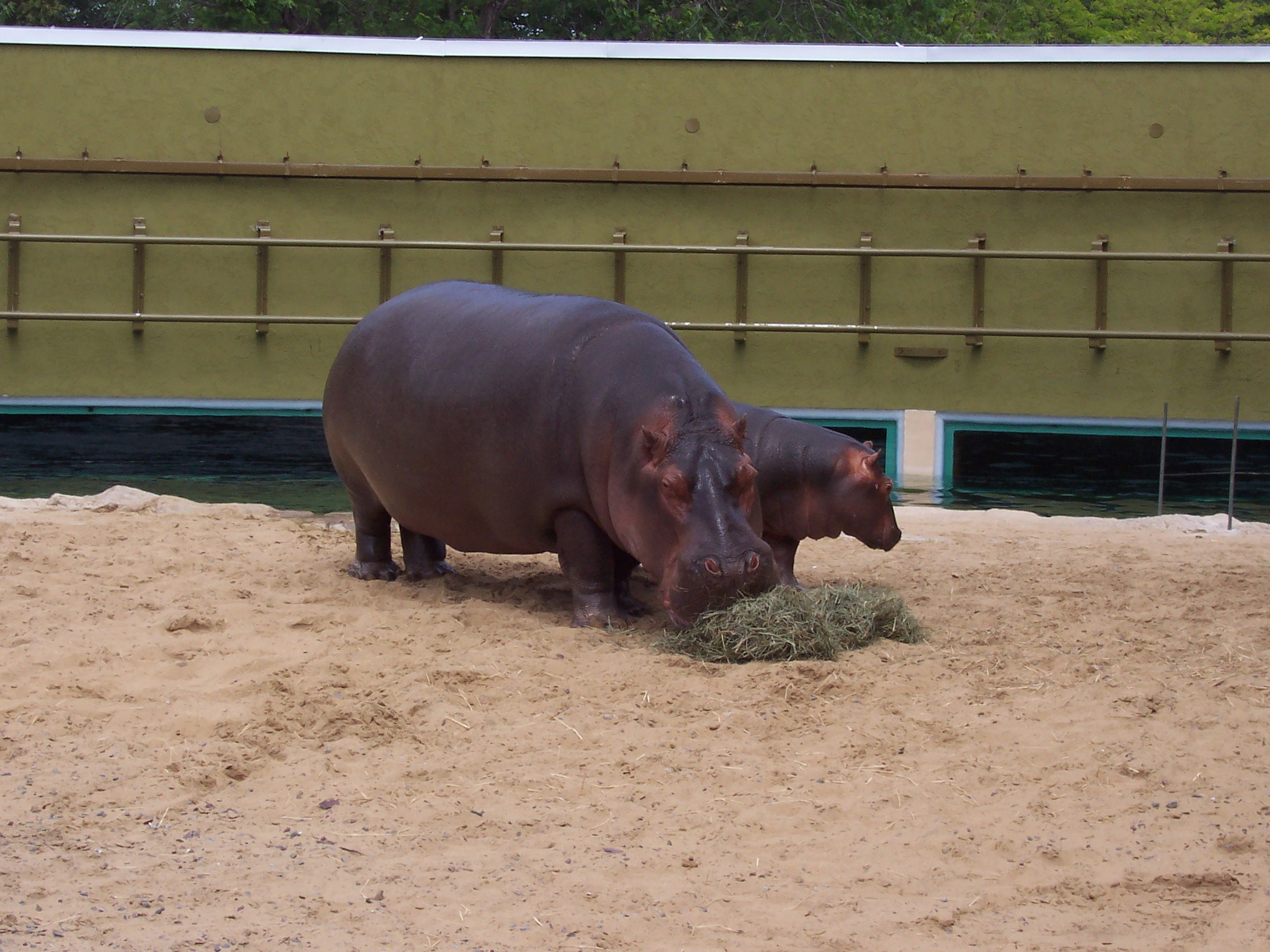
Hippos

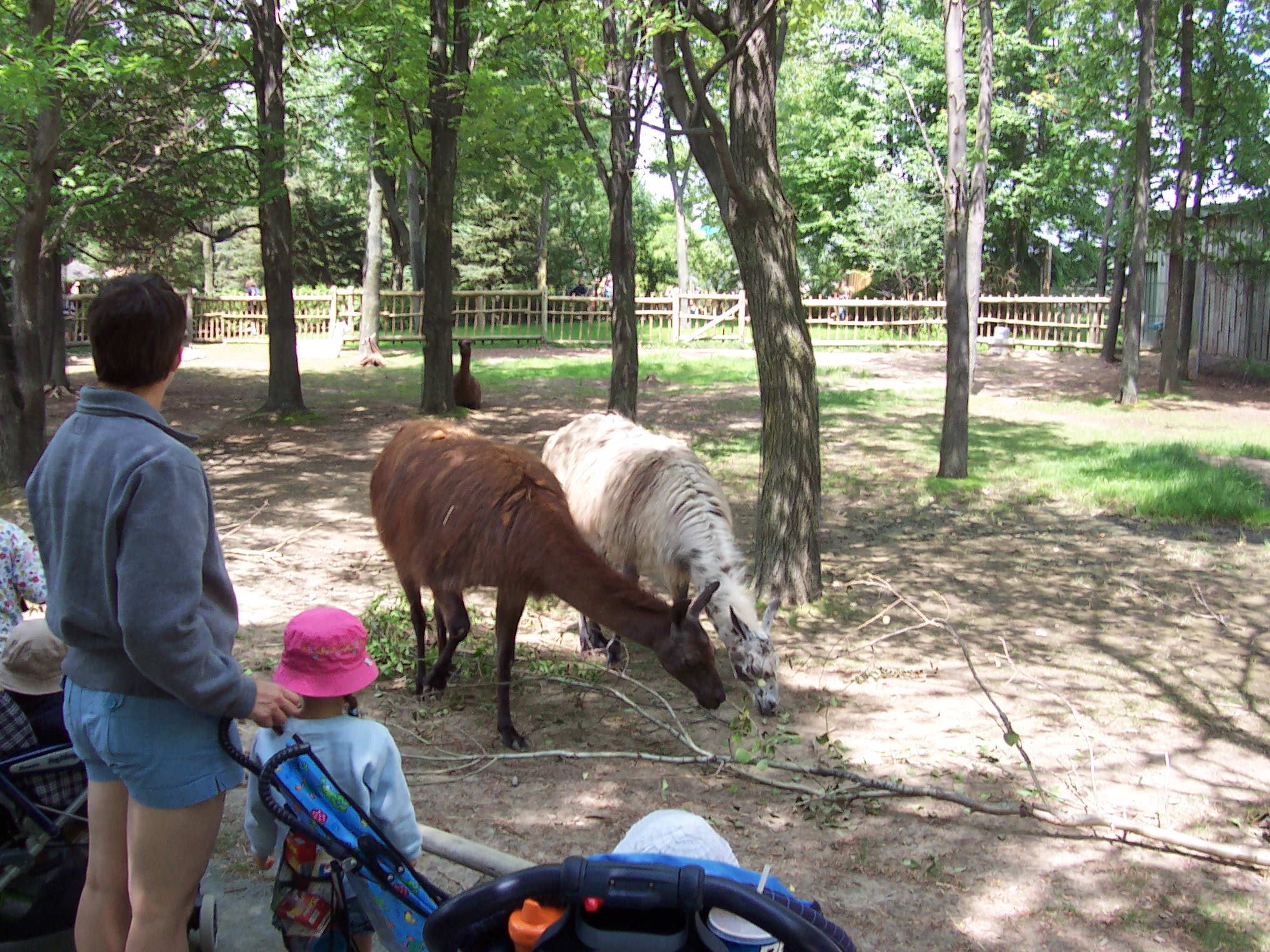
Llamas

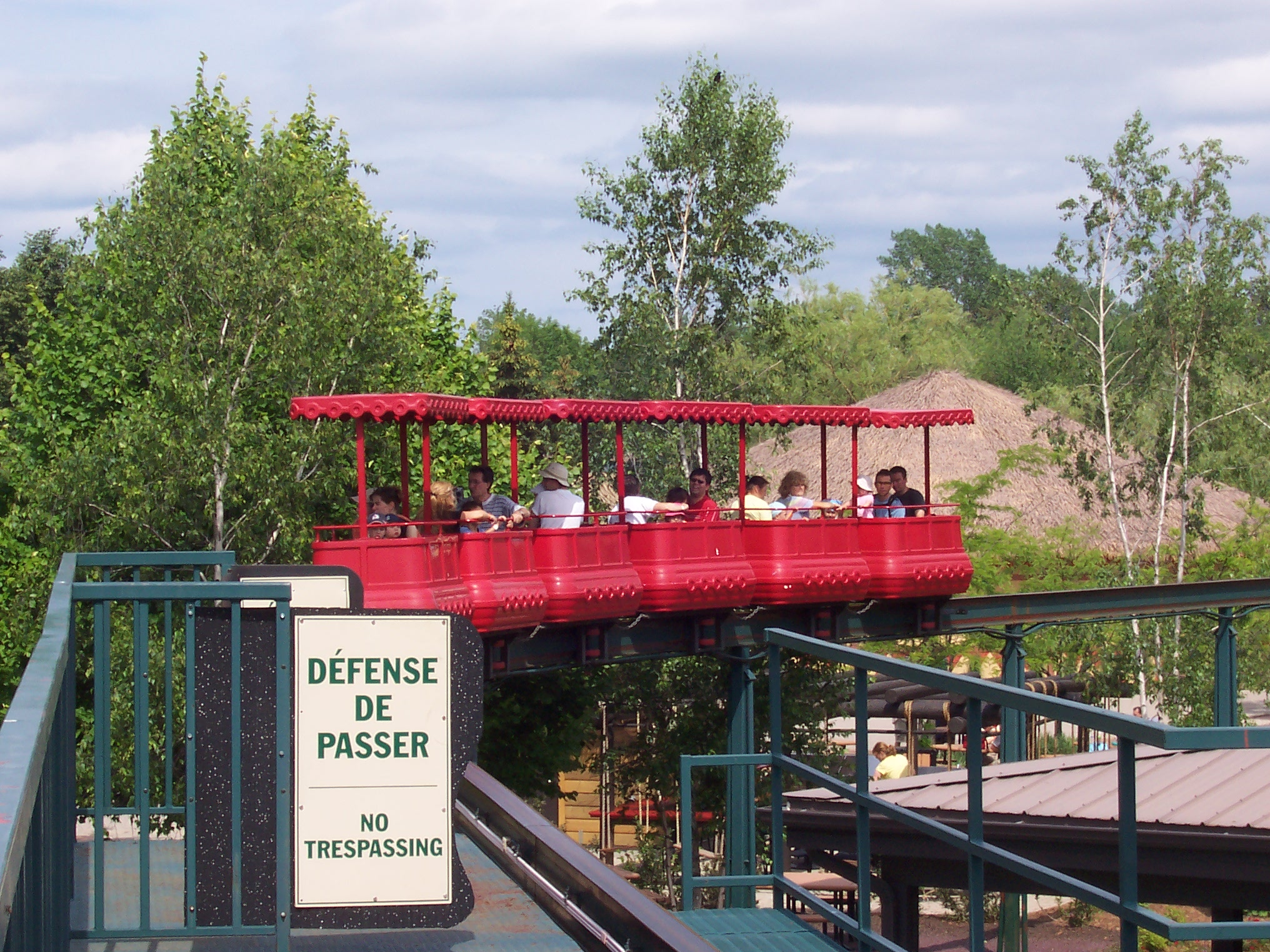
Monorail

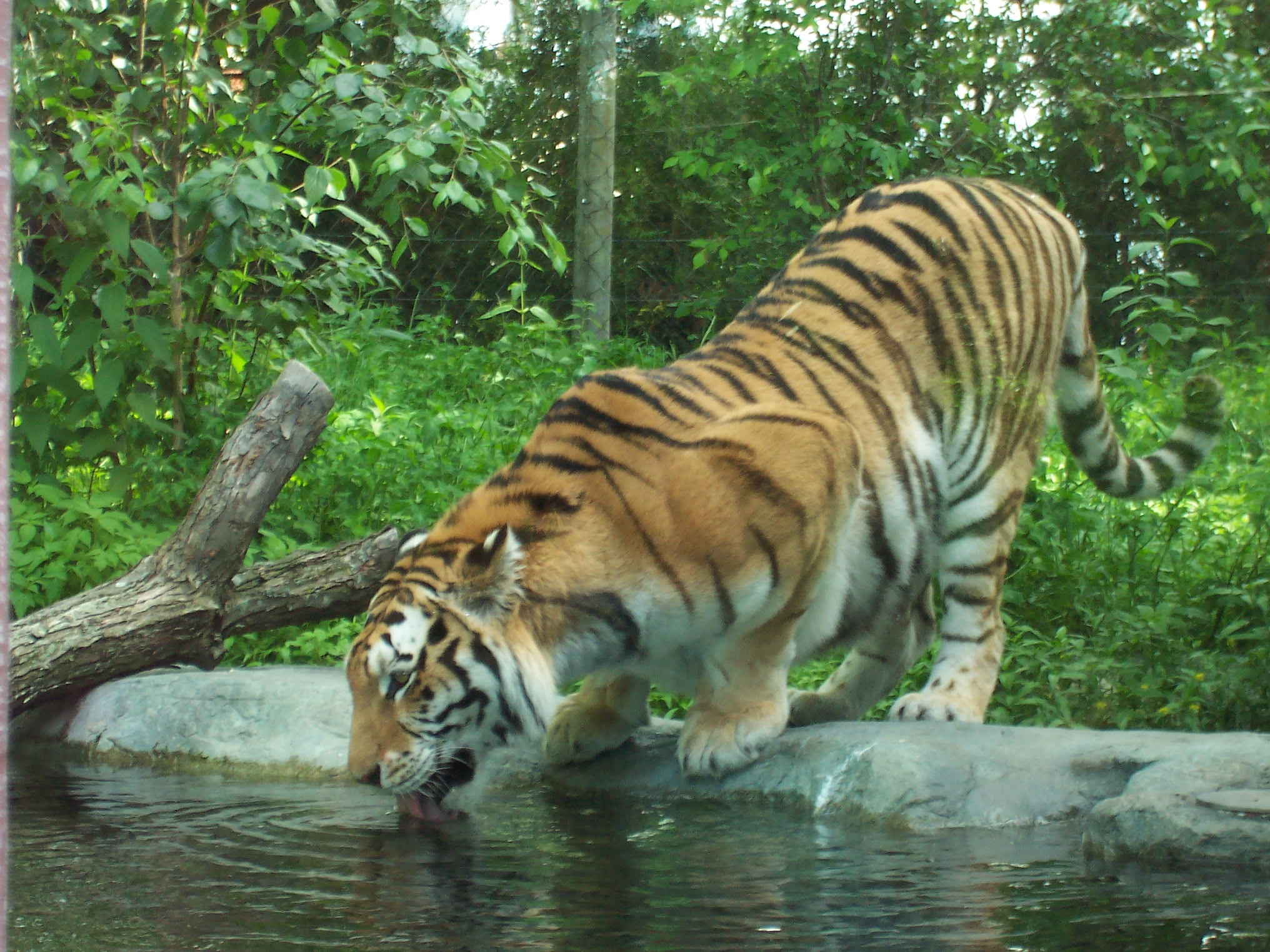
Tiger

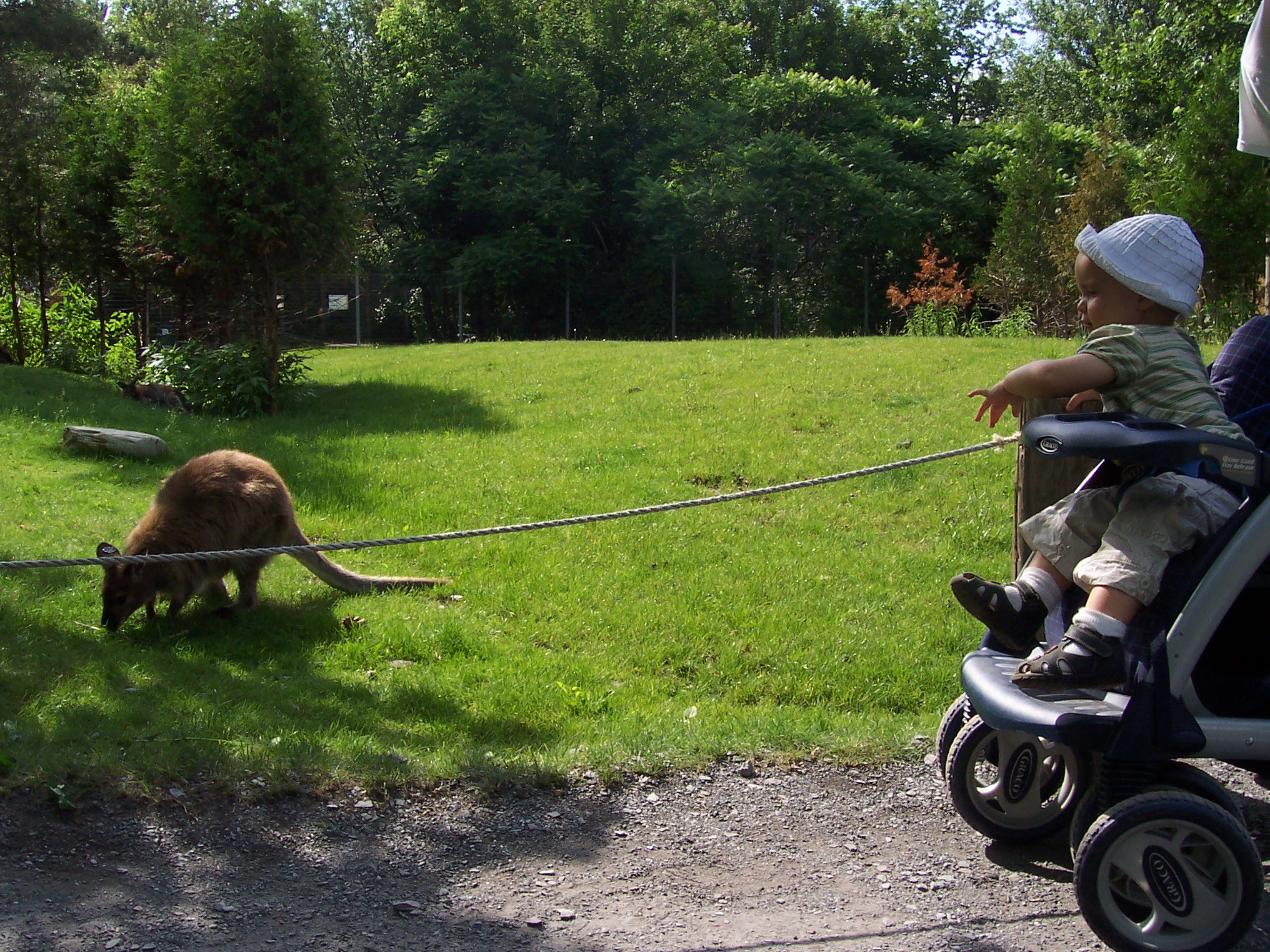
Wallaby.

== See also ==
- Mumba, a gorilla who lived at the Granby Zoo from the 1960s until his death in 2008
