= Nirit Dudovich =

Israeli physicist

- 'נירית דודוביץ
- Born: 1971 (age 54–55)
- Education: Weizmann Institute of Science; Tel Aviv University
- Scientific career
- Thesis: Quantum coherent control with shaped femtoseconds pulses (2004)

Nirit Dudovich (Hebrew: 'נירית דודוביץ) is an Israeli physicist who is the Robin Chemers Neustein Professorial Chair at the Weizmann Institute of Science. Her work considers strong field light–matter interactions and the generation of attosecond pulses. She was elected Fellow of the American Physical Society in 2016.

== Early life and education ==
Dudovich was born in Jerusalem. Her father Arnold Frank was a physicist. In 1989 she joined the Israel Defense Forces in the Intelligence Corps, where she served until 1993. She was an undergraduate student in physics and computer sciences at Tel Aviv University. She moved to the Weizmann Institute of Science as a graduate student, earning both a master's and graduate degree. Her research focused on quantum coherent control. After graduating, Dudovich moved to the National Research Council Canada.

== Research and career ==
In 2007, Dudovich joined the faculty at the Weizmann Institute of Science. Her research considers strong-field light–matter interactions, with a particular focus on the dynamics at ultrafast timescales. To this end, Dudovich developed frequency-resolved optomolecular gating. She has considered two aspects of high harmonic generation, including ionisation and recombination. She has made use of attosecond physics to better understand electronic processes such as tunnelling.

== Awards and honours ==
- 2003 Chorafas Foundation Award for Outstanding Achievement and the Gad Resheff Memorial Prize for Outstanding Achievements in Research
- 2004 Weizmann Institute Women in Science Fellowship
- 2012 IUPAP Young Scientist Prize
- 2012 Israel Physics Society Prize for Young Physicist
- 2013 Krill Prize for Excellence in Scientific Research
- 2015 Elected to the Israel Young Academy
- 2016 Elected Fellow of the American Physical Society
- 2017 Helen and Martin Kimmel Award for Innovative Investigation
- 2019 Named one of the most influential women scientists in Israel
- 2021 Weizmann prize for exact sciences
- 2027 Optica Fellow "for pioneering contributions to attosecond science and attosecond metrology"

== Selected publications ==
- Smirnova, Olga; Mairesse, Yann; Patchkovskii, Sergey; Nirit Dudovich; David Villeneuve; Corkum, Paul; Ivanov, Mikhail (2009). "High harmonic interferometry of multi-electron dynamics in molecules". Nature. 460 (7258): 972–977. doi:10.1038/nature08253. PMID 19626004. Wikidata Q33485824.
- Nirit Dudovich; Dan Oron; Yaron Silberberg (2002). "Single-pulse coherently controlled nonlinear Raman spectroscopy and microscopy". Nature. 418 (6897): 512–514. doi:10.1038/nature00933. PMID 12152073. Wikidata Q31100095.
- Dror Shafir; Sofer, Hadas; Bruner, Barry; et al. (2012). "Resolving the time when an electron exits a tunnelling barrier". Nature. 485 (7398): 343–346. Bibcode:2012Natur.485..343S. doi:10.1038/nature11025. PMID 22596157. Wikidata Q34273058.

== Personal life ==
Dudovich is married with three children.
