= Max Planck Institute of Geoanthropology =

German research institute

Coordinates: 50°55′3″N 11°34′41″E

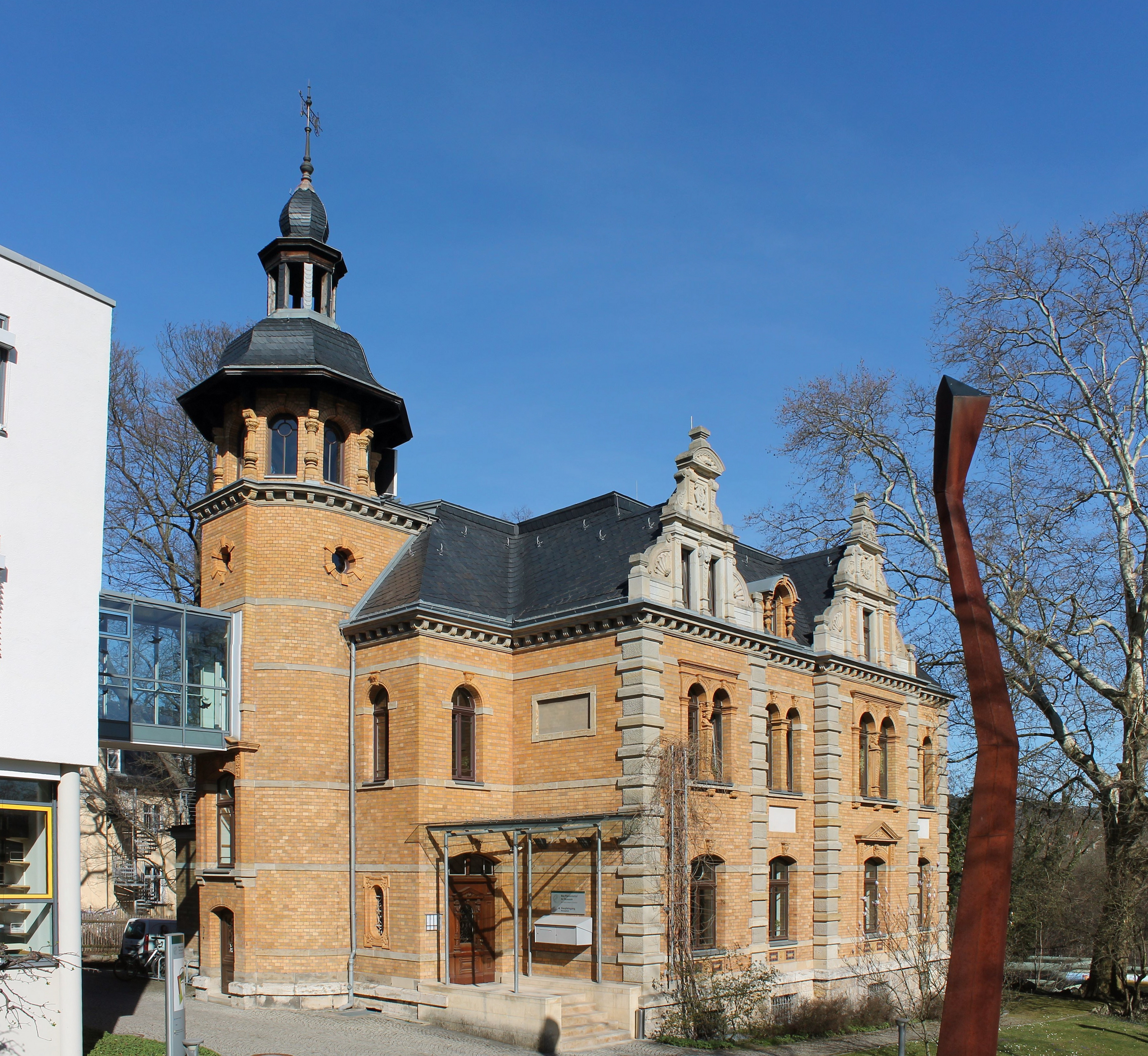
- The old building at the MPI for Economics in Jena
- Abbreviation: GEA
- Predecessor: Max Planck Institute of Economics; Max Planck Institute for the Science of Human History
- Established: 2022; 4 years ago
- Type: Scientific institute
- Purpose: Research in Planetary and Deep-time Human-Earth Systems Interaction
- Headquarters: Jena, Germany
- Key people: Jürgen Renn; Ricarda Winkelmann; Patrick Roberts
- Parent organization: Max Planck Society
- Affiliations: TPC
- Website: (in English) (in German)
- Formerly called: Max Planck Institute for Research into Economic Systems; Max Planck Institute for Economics; Max Planck Institute for History and the Sciences; Max Planck Institute for the Science of Human History

The Max Planck Institute of Geoanthropology (German: Max-Planck-Institut für Geoanthropologie) is a research institute of the Max Planck Society dedicated to the interdisciplinary study of the interactions between humans and the Earth system across deep time. The institute integrates archaeology, anthropology, Earth system science, ecology, and computational modeling to investigate the long-term coevolution of human societies, environments, and technologies. It is located in Jena, Germany.

== History ==
=== Max Planck Institute of Economics (1993–2014) ===
The institutional predecessor of the present institute was founded in 1993 as the Max Planck Institute for Research into Economic Systems (German: Max-Planck-Institut zur Erforschung von Wirtschaftssystemen). Its original research focus was the transformation of post-socialist economies in Central and Eastern Europe following the end of the Cold War.

In 2004, the institute was renamed the Max Planck Institute of Economics (German: Max-Planck-Institut für Ökonomik) to reflect an expanded research agenda addressing economic change more broadly. Research at this stage encompassed fields such as evolutionary economics, experimental economics, and entrepreneurship studies.

The institute was organized into three research groups:

- Evolutionary Economics Group, led by Ulrich Witt
- Strategic Interaction Group, led by Werner Güth
- Entrepreneurship, Growth and Public Policy Group, led by David B. Audretsch

=== Max Planck Institute for the Science of Human History (2014–2022) ===
In 2014, the institute underwent a major realignment within the Max Planck Society. After a brief transitional phase, it was officially re-established on 21 November 2014 as the Max Planck Institute for the Science of Human History. This marked a disciplinary shift away from economics toward the integrated study of human history using methods from the natural sciences, social sciences, and humanities.

From 2016 onward, the institute consisted of three interdisciplinary departments:

- Department of Archaeogenetics, directed by Johannes Krause
- Department of Linguistic and Cultural Evolution, directed by Russell Gray
- Department of Archaeology, directed by Nicole Boivin

In 2015, the institute assumed responsibility for maintaining Glottolog, previously hosted by the Max Planck Institute for Evolutionary Anthropology.

=== Max Planck Institute of Geoanthropology (since 2022) ===
In June 2022, the Max Planck Society announced the renaming of the institute to the Max Planck Institute of Geoanthropology. The new name reflects a broadened research focus on long-term interactions between humans, environments, and Earth system processes across deep time, integrating archaeology, anthropology, Earth system science, ecology, and computational approaches.

== Location ==
The institute is located on Kahlaische Strasse, about 1 km south-east of the city center. It is housed in a restored Victorian villa, linked by a glass bridge to a much larger modern building, which includes offices and other facilities for each of the research units, each unit having one floor of the main section of the building.

== Administration ==
The current directors of the institute are:

- Jürgen Renn (Founding Director)
- Ricarda Winkelmann (Founding Director)
- Patrick Roberts (Director)
