= Olga Smirnova =

Olga Smirnova may refer to:

- Olga Smirnova (dancer) (born 1991), Russian ballet dancer
- Olga Smirnova (wrestler) (born 1979), Russian-born Kazakhstani freestyle wrestler
- Olga Smirnova (scientist) (born 1973), Russian physicist
