= Mumba =

Mumba may refer to:

== People ==
- Antoine Agbepa Mumba (born 1956), a DR Congolese soukous singer, dancer, producer, and composer
- Bali Mumba (born 2001), English professional footballer
- Carl Mumba (born 1995), Zimbabwean cricketer who plays for Mid West Rhinos
- Florence Mumba (born 1948), Zambian judge
- Levi Zililo Mumba (died 1945), first President of the Nyasaland African Congress (NAC)
- Nevers Mumba (born 1960), Zambian politician and minister
- Omero Mumba (born 1989), Irish actor and singer
- Prince Mumba (athlete) (born 1984), Zambian Olympic track and field athlete, specializing in the 800 metres
- Robert Mambo Mumba (born 1978), Kenyan footballer, currently coaching the Swedish team Dalkurd FF
- Samantha Mumba (born 1983), Irish singer and actress
- Winter Mumba (died 1993), Zambian footballer and member of the national team
- Wisdom Mumba Chansa (1964–1993), Zambian football player
- Mumba Mwansa (born 1982), Zambian basketball player
- Mumba Kalifungwa (born c. 1970), Zambian accountant, banker and corporate executive

== Places ==
- Mumba Cave, an archeological site located in Tanzania near Lake Eyasi, containing important Stone Age artifacts
- Mumba Devi Temple, an old Hindu temple in the city of Mumbai dedicated to the goddess Mumbā

== Other ==
- Mumba (gorilla) (c. 1960–2008)

== See also ==
- Mumbai
- Mumbar
- Mumbhar
- Mumbra
- Mumbwa
- U Mumba
