= Martin Wolf (disambiguation) =

Martin Wolf (born 1946) is a British journalist.

Martin Wolf, Wolff, or Woolf, may also refer to:

- Martin Wolf (physicist) (born 1961), German experimental physicist
- Martin Wolff (1872–1953), German professor of law
- Martin Wolff (sculptor) (1852–1919), German artist
- Martin Woolf (1858–1928), Canadian politician and civil servant

== See also ==
- Martine Wolff (born 1996), Norwegian female handball player
