= Karl Scheel Prize =

German scientific prize

The Karl-Scheel-Preis (Karl Scheel Prize) is an award given annually by the Physikalische Gesellschaft zu Berlin (PGzB, Physical Society of Berlin), a regional association of the Deutsche Physikalische Gesellschaft (German Physical Society), for outstanding scientific work. The prize was established through an endowment by the German physicist Karl Scheel (1866 – 1936) and his wife Melida. Recipients are awarded with the Karl-Scheel Medal (Karl-Scheel Medaille) and 5.000 Euros. The Karl-Scheel Medal in bronze was designed by the German sculptor Richard Scheibe and has a diameter of 12 cm.

== List of recipients ==
Names of recipients as stated on the official website of the PGzB. Affiliations refer to the institution of the recipient at the time of the award ceremony.

- 2024: Gustav Mogull (Humboldt-Universität zu Berlin) and Tom S. Seifert (Freie Universität Berlin)
- 2023: Hayley Allison (Helmholtz-Zentrum Potsdam, Deutsches GeoForschungsZentrum GFZ)
- 2022: Björn Globisch (Technische Universität Berlin; Fraunhofer Institute for Telecommunications, Heinrich Hertz Institute, HHI)
- 2021: No Karl Scheel Prize was awarded
- 2020: Tobias Heindel (Technische Universität Berlin)
- 2019: Steve Albrecht (Helmholtz-Zentrum Berlin)
- 2018: Daniela Rupp (Max Born Institute for Nonlinear Optics and Short-Term Spectroscopy)
- 2017: Aljaž Godec (Universität Potsdam) and Ricarda Winkelmann (Potsdam-Institut für Klimafolgenforschung)
- 2016: Pierre Corfdir (Paul Drude Institute for Solid State Electronics)
- 2015: No Karl Scheel Prize was awarded
- 2014: Tobias Kampfrath (Fritz Haber Institute of the Max Planck Society)
- 2013: Ermin Malić (Technische Universität Berlin)
- 2012: Kathy Lüdge (Technische Universität Berlin)
- 2011: The Karl Scheel Prize was revoked
- 2010: Olga Smirnova (Max Born Institute for Nonlinear Optics and Short-Term Spectroscopy)
- 2009: Katharina Franke (Freie Universität Berlin)
- 2008: Norbert Koch (Humboldt-Universität zu Berlin)
- 2007: Uwe Bovensiepen (Freie Universität Berlin)
- 2006: No Karl Scheel Prize was awarded
- 2005: Stephanie Reich (Technische Universität Berlin)
- 2004: Markus Abel (Universität Potsdam)
- 2003: Francesca Moresco (Freie Universität Berlin)
- 2002: Erich Runge (Humboldt-Universität zu Berlin)
- 2001: Roland P. Netz (Max Planck Institute of Colloids and Interfaces)
- 2000: Andreas Wacker (Technische Universität Berlin)
- 2000: Eugen Weschke (Freie Universität Berlin)
- 1999: Alejandro R. Goni (Technische Universität Berlin)
- 1998: Norbert Esser (Technische Universität Berlin)
- 1998: Martin Wolf (Fritz-Haber-Institut Berlin)
- 1997: Siegfried Bauer (Universität Potsdam)
- 1996: Jörg Holland (Physikalisch-Technische Bundesanstalt)
- 1995: Wolfgang Hübner (Freie Universität Berlin)
- 1994: Reinhold Koch (Freie Universität Berlin)
- 1993: Christian Borgs (Freie Universität Berlin)
- 1992: Eckart Hasselbrink (Fritz-Haber-Institut)
- 1991: Michael Farle (Freie Universität Berlin)
- 1991: Claus Schneider (Freie Universität Berlin)
- 1990: Manfred Pakull (Technische Universität Berlin)
- 1989: Mario Prietsch (Freie Universität Berlin)
- 1988: Rasit Tepe (Heinrich-Hertz-Institut Berlin)
- 1987: Jürgen Gutowski (Technische Universität Berlin)
- 1987: Andreas Knauf (Freie Universität Berlin)
- 1986: Rainer Sielemann (Hahn-Meitner Institut Berlin (now Helmholtz-Zentrum Berlin))
- 1986: Heinrich Metzner (Hahn-Meitner Institut Berlin (now Helmholtz-Zentrum Berlin))
- 1985: Johann Schönhense (Fritz-Haber-Institut)
- 1984: Friedhelm Lendzian (Freie Universität Berlin)
- 1983: Manfred Rosenzweig (Technische Universität Berlin)
- 1982: Norbert Ernst (Fritz-Haber-Institut)
- 1982: Dietmar Riegel (Freie Universität Berlin)
- 1981: Rüdiger Feretti (Technische Universität Berlin)
- 1980: Klaus Grützmacher (Physikalische-Technische Bundesanstalt)
- 1980: Joachim Seidel (Physikalische-Technische Bundesanstalt)
- 1979: Michael Steiner (Hahn-Meitner Institut Berlin (now Helmholtz-Zentrum Berlin))
- 1978: Werner Rodewald (Technische Universität Berlin)
- 1977: Heinz Deuling (Freie Universität Berlin)
- 1977: Dietmar Theis (Technische Universität Berlin)
- 1976: Walter Ekardt (Technische Universität Berlin)
- 1976: Berndt Kulow (Technische Universität Berlin)
- 1975: Gerhard Müller (Technische Universität Berlin)
- 1974: Faramaz Mahdjuuri-Sabet (Technische Universität Berlin)
- 1974: Nikolaus Stolterfoht (Hahn-Meitner Institut Berlin (now Helmholtz-Zentrum Berlin))
- 1973: No Karl Scheel Prize was awarded
- 1972: Heinrich Homeyer (Hahn-Meitner Institut Berlin (now Helmholtz-Zentrum Berlin))
- 1972: Klaus-Erik Kirchfeld (Technische Universität Berlin)
- 1971: Jürgen Andrä (Freie Universität Berlin)
- 1971: Burkhard Lischke (Technische Universität Berlin)
- 1970: Dietrich Neubert (Physikalische-Technische Bundesanstalt)
- 1970: Reinhart Radebold (AEG Berlin)
- 1969: Peter Rohner (Technische Universität Berlin)
- 1969: Burkhard Wende (Physikalische-Technische Bundesanstalt)
- 1968: Gerd Herziger (Technische Universität Berlin)
- 1968: Horst Weber (Technische Universität Berlin)
- 1967: Dieter Hofmann (Technische Universität Berlin)
- 1967: Friedrich Thon (Siemens AG Berlin)
- 1966: Jürgen Geiger und Werner Stickel (Technische Universität Berlin)
- 1966: Klaus Möbius (Freie Universität Berlin)
- 1966: Reinhard Nink (Physikalische-Technische Bundesanstalt)
- 1965: Gerd Koppelmann (Technische Universität Berlin)
- 1964: Günter Sauerbrey (Technische Universität Berlin)
- 1963: Klaus Grohmann (Technische Universität Berlin)
- 1962: Wolf-Dieter Riecke (Technische Universität Berlin)
- 1961: Gerhard Simonsohn (Freie Universität Berlin)
- 1960: Herbert Schirmer (Technische Universität Berlin)
- 1959: Hans-Joachim Hamisch (Technische Universität Berlin)
- 1959: Arthur Tausend (Technische Universität Berlin)
- 1958: Gerhard Hildebrandt (Fritz-Haber-Institut)

== See also ==
- List of physics awards
