= Johannes Krause =

German biochemist, geneticist and paleontologist

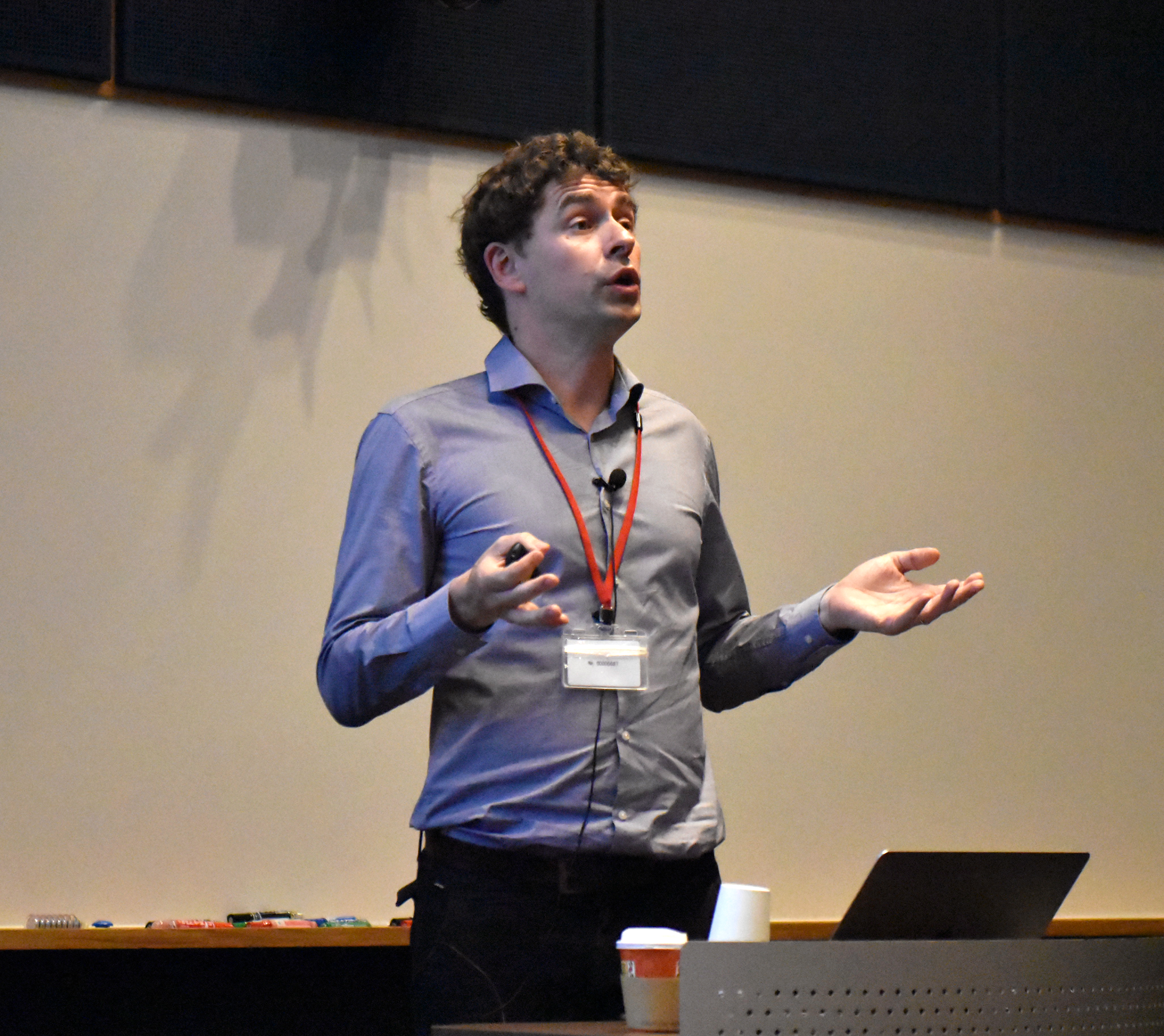
Johannes Krause, 2019

Johannes Krause (born July 17, 1980, in Leinefelde) is a German biochemist with a research focus on historical infectious diseases and human evolution. Since 2010, he has been professor of archaeology and paleogenetics at the University of Tübingen. In 2014, Krause was named a founding co-director of the new Max Planck Institute for the Science of Human History in Jena.

== Career ==
From 2000 to 2005, Krause studied biochemistry in Leipzig and at the University College Cork in Ireland. In 2005 he obtained his diploma with the publication The mitochondrial genome of the woolly mammoth at the Max Planck Institute for Evolutionary Anthropology, followed by a doctoral dissertation in 2008 under Svante Pääbo entitled From genes to genomes: Applications for multiplex PCR in Ancient DNA Research regarding genetic investigations into Neanderthals and cave bears.

In 2010, for his doctoral thesis he was awarded the Tübingen Award for Early Prehistory and Quaternary Ecology. The same year, for his co-authorship of the Science article A draft sequence and preliminary analysis of the Neandertal genome he received the Newcomb Cleveland Prize of the American Association for the Advancement of Science, the prize for the best article of the year. In October 2010, he became a junior professor at the Institute of Scientific Archaeology in Tübingen. Since then he has headed the working group on paleogenetics at the institute.

In the summer of 2014, it was announced that the Max Planck Institute of Economics in Jena would receive a different mandate. Along with Russell Gray, Krause was appointed co-director of a new Max Planck Institute of History and the Sciences, starting February 1, 2014. At the same time Krause remains an Honorary Professor at the University of Tübingen.

In 2019, he published Die Reise unserer Gene: Eine Geschichte über uns und unsere Vorfahren (English translation A Short History of Humanity: A New History of Old Europe in 2021), co-authored with journalist Thomas Trappe. It is a summary of the state of the art of archaeogenetics as it relates to the peopling of Europe.

== Research ==
Krause's focus is genetic analysis of ancient DNA using DNA sequencing. His research interests include human evolution and historical pathogens and epidemics.

In 2010, Krause and others successfully reconstructed the mitochondrial DNA of a Denisovan individual from 30 milligrams of powdered material from a finger bone. This enabled him to demonstrate that the Denisovans represented an independent branch of the genus Homo which diverged from the Neanderthal lineage 640,000 years ago. He also contributed to research in the genetic heritage of Neanderthals, which demonstrated that Neanderthals and modern humans share the same "language gene" (FOXP2) which suggests Neanderthals also had the capacity to speak.

Krause was part of the international research team which in 2011 reconstructed the genome of the bacterium Yersinia pestis from DNA samples extracted from the 14th-century East Smithfield plague cemetery in London, establishing definitive proof that the medieval Black Death epidemic was caused by Yersinia pestis.

In June 2013, Krause's group in collaboration with the Institute of Technology Lausanne published research showing that the leprosy bacterium has not changed genetically since the Middle Ages and all leprosy bacteria can be attributed worldwide to a common ancestor dating to 4000 BC.

In 2017, a team led by Krause performed the first reliable sequencing of the genomes of mummified individuals from Ancient Egypt. However, by the team's own admission in the manuscript, the samples may not have been representative of the majority of Egyptians. Other haplotype and PCR DNA findings indicate Sub-Saharan African origin in modern Egyptian populations. Their study looked at 90 individuals and revealed that they "closely resembled ancient and modern Near Eastern populations, especially those in the Levant, and had almost no DNA from sub-Saharan Africa. What's more, the genetics of the mummies remained remarkably consistent even as different powers—including Nubians, Greeks, and Romans—conquered the empire.

In 2019, Krause and others published an analysis of the spread of Y. pestis during the Black Death epidemic beginning in Europe in 1347. Among the findings, a 14th-century strain from the Samara region in Russia was found to be ancestral to the Black Death. Other genomes from across Europe during the period were identical, suggesting the speed at which the plague spread. Later on, at least two distinct clades appear to have developed within Europe. One is associated with disease outbreaks in Germany and Switzerland during the 15th–17th century AD. Another relates to outbreaks in London in the 17th-century and Marseille in the 18th-century. This suggests that the disease may have remained dormant in more than one disease reservoir in Europe. The occurrences of plague in London and Marseille may also be related to maritime travel. Modern strains of Y. pestis, such as those found in Madagascar in 2017, are very similar to the ancestral strain of the Black Death. Improved human hygiene, decreasing populations of black rats and fleas, and lessened human contact with them, likely did more to limit transmission of the disease than genetic changes.

== Publications ==
- Lamnidis T.C.; et al. (2018). "Ancient Fennoscandian genomes reveal origin and spread of Siberian ancestry in Europe". Nature Communications. 9 (5018): 5018. Bibcode:2018NatCo...9.5018L. doi:10.1038/s41467-018-07483-5. PMC 6258758. PMID 30479341.
- Krause J.; et al. (2007). "Neanderthals in central Asia and Siberia" (PDF). Nature. 449 (7164): 902–904. Bibcode:2007Natur.449..902K. doi:10.1038/nature06193. PMID 17914357. S2CID 2084412.
- Krause J.; et al. (2008). "Mitochondrial genomes reveal an explosive radiation of extinct and extant bears near the Miocene-Pliocene boundary". BMC Evolutionary Biology. 8 (1): 220. doi:10.1186/1471-2148-8-220. PMC 2518930. PMID 18662376.
- Krause J, et al. (2010). "The complete mitochondrial DNA genome of an unknown hominin from southern Siberia". Nature. 464 (7290): 894–897. Bibcode:2010Natur.464..894K. doi:10.1038/nature08976. PMC 10152974. PMID 20336068.
- Green R. E., Krause J.; et al. (2010). "A draft sequence and preliminary analysis of the Neandertal genome". Science. 328 (5979): 710–722. Bibcode:2010Sci...328..710G. doi:10.1126/science.1188021. PMC 5100745. PMID 20448178.
- J. Krause and Thomas Trappe: Die Reise unserer Gene: Eine Geschichte über uns und unsere Vorfahren. Propyläen Verlag, Februar 2019, ISBN 978-3549100028

== Video ==
- Video on Johannes Krause's research (Latest Thinking)
