= Ulrich Witt =

German economist

Ulrich Witt (6. November 1946 in Göttingen) is a German economist and former Director of the Evolutionary Economics Group at the Max Planck Institute of Economics in Jena (Germany). He also holds an honorary professorship at the Friedrich Schiller University. His areas of research include evolutionary economics, long-term trends in economic development, as well as transformations that economic institutions, production, and consumption activities undergo over time.

Witt studied economics at the University of Göttingen and received his Ph.D. in 1979. After completing the Habilitation at the University of Mannheim in 1985 he served as a professor of economics at the University of Mannheim, the University of Southern California (Los Angeles), the Saarland University (Saarbrücken), and the University of Freiburg before he joined the Max Planck Institute of Economics in 1995.

Ulrich Witt is a member of several scientific advisory boards/bodies. He was awarded the K. William Kapp Prize from the European Association for Evolutionary Political Economy in 1992 and received an honorary doctorate from the University Witten-Herdecke in 2003. Furthermore, he is an honorary member of the Japanese Association for Evolutionary Economics. Ulrich Witt has published over 100 scholarly articles, as well as 12 books.

Central to his work is the idea of a naturalistic approach to evolutionary economics. His research connects insights from different disciplines such as biology and psychology and economics with the aim to enrich economic thinking. He applied this approach both to consumer theory and the theory of the firm.
