= Karl Scheel =

German physicist

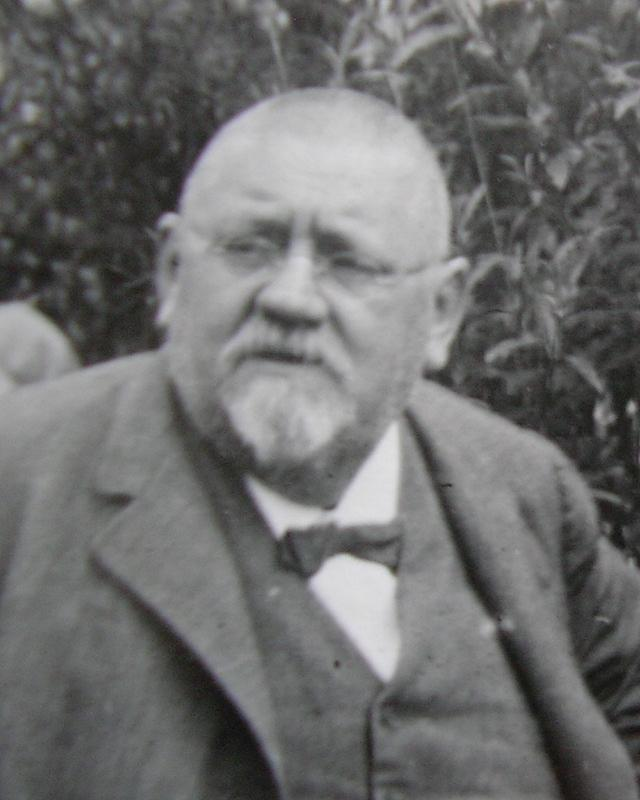
Karl Scheel (1928)

Karl Friedrich Franz Christian Scheel (10 March 1866 in Rostock – 8 November 1936 in Berlin) was a German physicist. He was a senior executive officer and head of Department IIIb at the Reich Physical and Technical Institute. Additionally, he served as editor of the journal Fortschritte der Physik, the semi-monthly bibliographic section of the journal Physikalische Berichte, the Verhandlungen of the German Physical Society, and the society's journal Zeitschrift für Physik. From 1926 to 1935, he was editor of the Handbuch der Physik. An endowment by Scheel and his wife Melida funds the annual awarding of the Karl Scheel Prize by the Physical Society in Berlin.

== Education ==
From 1885 to 1890, Scheel studied at the Universität Rostock and the Friedrich-Wilhelms-Universität (today, the Humboldt-Universität zu Berlin). He received his doctorate in 1890, at the University of Berlin, with a thesis on the expansion of water with temperature. Scheel was authorized to use the title Professor, hence, at some point, he completed the requirements for Habilitation.

== Career ==
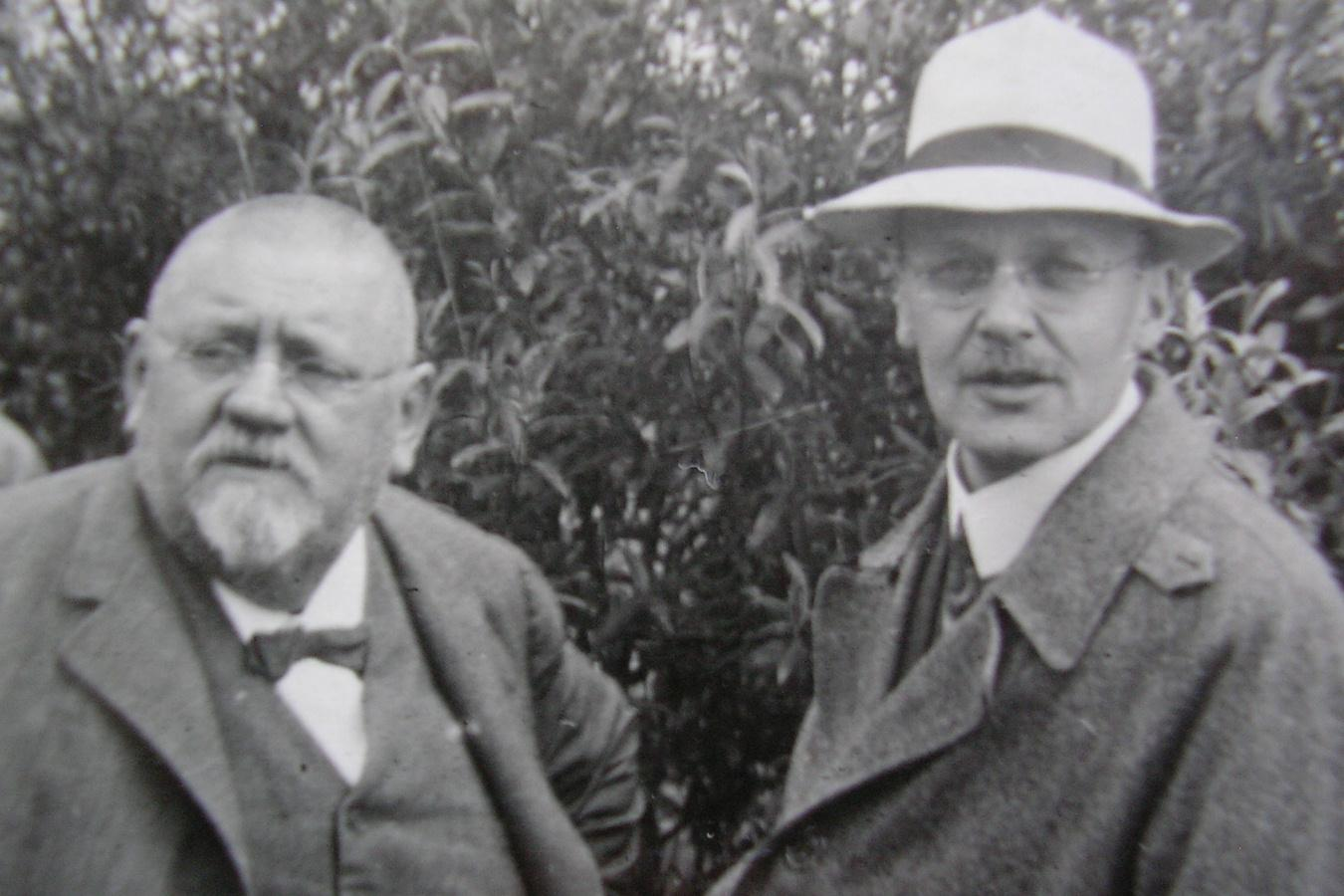
Karl Scheel and Hans Geiger (1928)

After receipt of his doctorate, Scheel became a part-time assistant at the Kaiserliche Normal-Aichungs-Commission (Imperial Bureau of Standards). From 1891, he was employed at the Physikalisch-Technische Reichsanstalt (PTR, Reich Physical and Technical Institute, after 1945 renamed the Physikalisch-Technische Bundesanstalt). From 1904 to 1931, he was a Mitglied (member) and finally Geheimer Regierungsrat und Leiter (senior executive officer and head) of Department IIIb at the PTR.

Additionally, Scheel served as editor of various publications. From 1899 to 1918, he was editor of the journal Fortschritte der Physik and of the semi-monthly bibliographic section of the journal Physikalische Berichte. From 1902, he was the editor of the Verhandlungen (Proceedings) of the Deutsche Physikalische Gesellschaft (DPG, German Physical Society), and from 1920 editor of the society's journal Zeitschrift für Physik. From 1926 to 1935, he was editor of the prestigious, multi-volume series Handbuch der Physik, together with Hans Geiger.

== Honor ==
Scheel and his wife Melida left an endowment which is used by the Physikalische Gesellschaft zu Berlin (PGzB, Physical Society in Berlin), a regional association of the Deutsche Physikalische Gesellschaft (German Physical Society), to yearly award the Karl-Scheel-Preis (Karl Scheel Prize), for outstanding scientific work.

== Literature by Scheel ==
- Karl Scheel Die Physikalisch Technische Reichsanstalt in Charlottenburg, Akademische Rundschau (January, 1913), as cited in E. S. Hodgson Twenty-Five Years' Work at the Physikalisch - Technische Reichsanstalt, Charlottenburg, Nature Volume 91, Issue 2287, 665-667 (28 August 1913)
- Karl Scheel Die Physik auf der 85. Versammlung Deutscher Naturforscher und Ärzte in Wien, September 1913, Die Naturwissenschaften Volume 1, 1175–1179 (28 November 1913) and 1205–1208 (5 December 1913)
- Scheel, Holborn, Jaeger, and Brodhun Die Physikalisch-Technische Reichsanstalt; Fünfundzwanzig Jahre ihrer Tätigkeit, Die Naturwissenschafien Numbers 8, 10, 12, and 14 (1913), as cited in E. S. Hodgson Twenty-Five Years' Work at the Physikalisch - Technische Reichsanstalt, Charlottenburg, Nature Volume 91, 665–667, Issue 2287 (28 August 1913)
- Karl Scheel (Geh. Reg.-Rat. Prof. Dr.) Die Tätigkeit der Physikalisch-Technischen Reichsanstalt im Jahre 1916: Abteilung III für Wärme und Druck, Die Naturwissenschaften Volume 5, Number 47, 704 – 705 (November, 1917). Affiliation: Mitglied der Physikalisch-Technischen Reichsanstalt, Berlin-Dahlem.
- Karl Scheel Die Tätigkeit der Physikalisch - Technischen Reichsanstalt im Jahre 1918, Die Naturwissenschaften Volume 7, Number 52, 997 – 1002 (December, 1919). Affiliation: Mitglied der Physikalisch-Technischen Reichsanstalt, Berlin-Dahlem.

== Bibliography ==
- H. Ebert Karl Scheel, Zeitschrift für Physik Volume 104, Numbers 1–2, I – III (January, 1937). Affiliation: Berlin-Wilmersdorf.
- Hentschel, Klaus (Editor) and Ann M. Hentschel (Editorial Assistant and Translator) Physics and National Socialism: An Anthology of Primary Sources (Birkhäuser, 1996)
