= Jürgen Renn =

German historian of science (b. 1956)

Jürgen Renn (born 11 July 1956 in Moers, West Germany) is a German historian of science, and since 2022 Founding Director of the Max Planck Institute of Geoanthropology in Jena.

== Short biography ==
Renn studied physics at the Free University of Berlin and at the Sapienza University of Rome. In 1987 he received his Ph.D. in mathematical physics from Technische Universität Berlin.

Between 1986 and 1992 he worked as co-editor of the "Collected Papers of Albert Einstein" at Boston University. Between 1991 and 1996 he co-directed with Peter Damerow the "Arbeitsstelle Albert Einstein" at the Max Planck Institute for Human Development in Berlin.

In 1993/94 he was visiting professor at Tel Aviv University and at the ETH Zurich. Since its founding in 1994 Renn was a Director at the Max Planck Institute for the History of Science (MPIWG) in Berlin. In 2022, he was appointed Founding Director of the Max Planck Institute of Geoanthropology, which is based on a concept that emerged from his research on the Anthropocene conducted jointly with a global research network.

Renn holds an honorary professorship for the history of science at the Humboldt University of Berlin and at the Free University of Berlin. Since 1998 he is Adjunct Professor for philosophy and physics at Boston University. He is a member of the Academy of Sciences Leopoldina, the International Academy for the History of Science, and serves on the executive boards of Berlin's German Universities Excellence Initiative 'Topoi' and the Berliner Antike-Kolleg.

His writings include The Formative Years of Relativity: The History and Meaning of Einstein's Princeton Lectures (with Hanoch Gutfreund, Princeton University Press, 2017) and The Road to Relativity: The History and Meaning of Einstein's "The Foundation of General Relativity", Featuring the Original Manuscript of Einstein's Masterpiece (with Hanoch Gutfreund, Princeton University Press, 2017), and Einstein on Einstein: Autobiographical and Scientific Reflections (with Hanoch Gutfreund, Princeton University Press, 2020).

== Scholarly activities ==
=== Research and fields of study ===
Renn's research projects focus on long-term developments of knowledge while taking into account processes of globalization. His research projects have dealt with the historical development of mechanics from antiquity until the 20th century. In this context Renn also investigates the origins of mechanics in China, the transformation of ancient knowledge, and the exchange of knowledge between Europe and China in the early modern period. A main focus of Renn's research is the history of modern physics, investigating the origin and development of the general theory of relativity, and of quantum theory in particular. Renn has written about the Anthropocene in relation to the history of knowledge and science.

=== Digitalization and open access ===
Since the emergence of the World Wide Web, Renn has advocated for free access to historical sources. In 1992 he launched an initiative with Peter Damerow and Paolo Galluzzi to create a freely accessible “Galileo-Einstein Electronic Archive” online. With support from the European Community, he later founded the ECHO-Initiative (European Cultural Heritage Online) to promote the study of historical sources online. Renn is one of the initiators of the Berlin Declaration on Open Access to Knowledge in the Sciences and Humanities and launched the publishing platform Edition Open Access together with other colleagues from the Max Planck Society.

=== Exhibitions ===
Renn has organized several exhibitions in the area of the history of science, technology, and culture. He has co-organized several exhibitions, including:

- 2005: Albert Einstein – Chief Engineer of the Universe in the course of the World Year of Physics 2005, Kronprinzenpalais (Berlin)
- 2008: Max-Planck – Revolutionär wider Willen, German Museum of Technology (Berlin)
- 2010: Weltwissen – 300 Jahre Wissenschaften in Berlin, Martin-Gropius-Bau (Berlin)
- 2013: Archimedes. Art and Invention Science, Capitoline Museums (Rome)

== Awards and fellowships ==
- 1988: Fellow, Fritz Thyssen Stiftung, Berlin
- 1988: Fellow, Consiglio Nazionale delle Ricerche, Rome
- 1988–1989: Fellow, Institute for Advanced Study, Berlin
- 1992: Visiting scholar at the Forschungsschwerpunkt "Wissenschaftsgeschichte und Wissenschaftstheorie" der Gesellschaft für wissenschaftliche Neuvorhaben der Max Planck Society Berlin
- 1998: Pirelli Internetional Award
- 2011: Premio Anassilaos International
- 2014: Premio Internazionale "Marco & Alberto Ippolito", Sezione cultura
- 2014: Francis-Bacon-Award
- 2014: Max Planck Communitas Award
- 2014: Neuenschwander Prize
- 2018: Commandino Medal
- 2023: Abraham Pais Prize for History of Physics

== Selected publications ==
=== Books ===
- The Einsteinian Revolution: The Historical Roots of His Breakthroughs. Princeton: Princeton University Press, 2023 (with Hanoch Gutfreund).
- The Road to Relativity The Road to Relativity: The History and Meaning of Einstein's "The Foundation of General Relativity". Princeton: Princeton University Press, 2015 (with Hanoch Gutfreund).
- Relativity: the Special and the General Theory, 100th Anniversary Edition. Princeton: Princeton University Press, 2015 (with Hanoch Gutfreund).
- Wissensgeschichte der Architektur. Vol. 1: Vom Neolithikum bis zum Alten Orient; vol. 2: Vom Alten Ägypten bis zum Antiken Rom; vol. 3: Vom Mittelalter bis zur Frühen Neuzeit. Studies 3, 4, 5: Max Planck Research Library in the History and Development of Knowledge. Berlin, Edition Open Access, 2014 (with Wilhelm Osthues, Hermann Schlimme).
- The Equilibrium Controversy. Guidobaldo Del Monte´s Critical Notes on the Mechanics of Jordanus and Benedetti and Their Historical and Conceptual Background. Berlin: Edition Open Access, 2012 (with Peter Damerow).
- The Globalization of Knowledge in History. Berlin: Edition Open Access, 2012
- Boltzmann und das Ende des mechanistischen Weltbildes (Wiener Vorlesungen, Band 130). Wien: Picus Verlag, 2007.
- The Genesis of General Relativity, 4 Vols. (Boston Studies in the Philosophy of Science, vol. 250): vol. 1 and 2 (Einstein's Zurich Notebooks), vol. 3 (Gravitation in the twilight of classical physics – between mechanics, field theory and astronomy), vol. 4 (Gravitation in the twilight of classical physics – the promise of mathematics). Dordrecht: Springer, 2007.
- Positioning the History of Science. (Boston Studies in the Philosophie of Science, vol. 248). Dordrecht: Springer, 2007 (with Kostas Gavroglu).
- Albert Einstein – Ingenieur des Universums. 3 Vols. Berlin: Wiley-VCH, 2006
- Auf den Schultern von Riesen und Zwergen: Einsteins unvollendete Revolution. Berlin: Wiley-VCH, 2006.

=== Articles and book chapters ===
- "From the History of Science to the History of Knowledge – and Back," in Centaurus 57(1), 2015: 35–53.
- "Einstein’s Copernican Revolution," in The Cambridge Companion to Einstein, edited by Michel Janssen und Christoph Lehner, 38–71. New York: Cambridge University Press, 2014 (with Robert Rynasiewicz).
- "The Globalization of Knowledge in History and its Normative Challenges," in Rechtsgeschichte/Legal History 2014 (22):52–60.
- "Beyond Editions: Historical Sources in the Digital Age," in Internationalität und Interdisziplinarität der Editionswissenschaft, edited by Michael Stolz, and Yen-Chun Chen, 9–28. editio / Beihefte 38. Berlin: De Gruyter, 2014
- "Learning from Kushim about the Origin of Writing and Farming," in Grain | Vapor | Ray. Textures of the Anthropocene, edited by Katrin Klingan, Ashkan Sepahvand, Christoph Rosol und Bernd M. Scherer, 241–259. Cambridge: MIT Press, 2015.
- "Schrödinger and the Genesis of Wave Mechanics," in Erwin Schrödinger – 50 Years After, edited by Wolfgang L. Reiter und Jakob Yngvason, 9–36. Zurich: European Mathematical Society, 2013.
- "The Emergence of Statistical Mechanics," in The Oxford Handbook of the History of Physics, edited by Jed Z. Buchwald und Robert Fox, 765–788. Oxford: Oxford University Press, 2013 (with Olivier Darrigol).
- "The Transformation of Ancient Mechanics into a Mechanistic World View," in Transformationen antiker Wissenschaften, edited by Georg Toepfer und Hartmut Böhme, 243–267. Transformationen der Antike, Berlin: De Gruyter, 2010 (with Peter Damerow).
