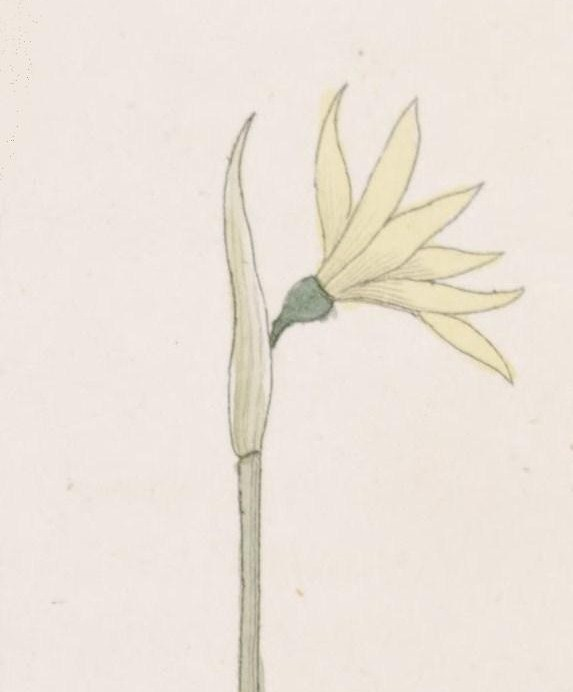

Conservation status
- Least Concern (IUCN 3.1)

Scientific classification
- Kingdom: Plantae
- Clade: Tracheophytes
- Clade: Angiosperms
- Clade: Monocots
- Order: Asparagales
- Family: Amaryllidaceae
- Subfamily: Amaryllidoideae
- Genus: Narcissus
- Species: N. cavanillesii

Binomial name
- Narcissus cavanillesii Barra & G.López
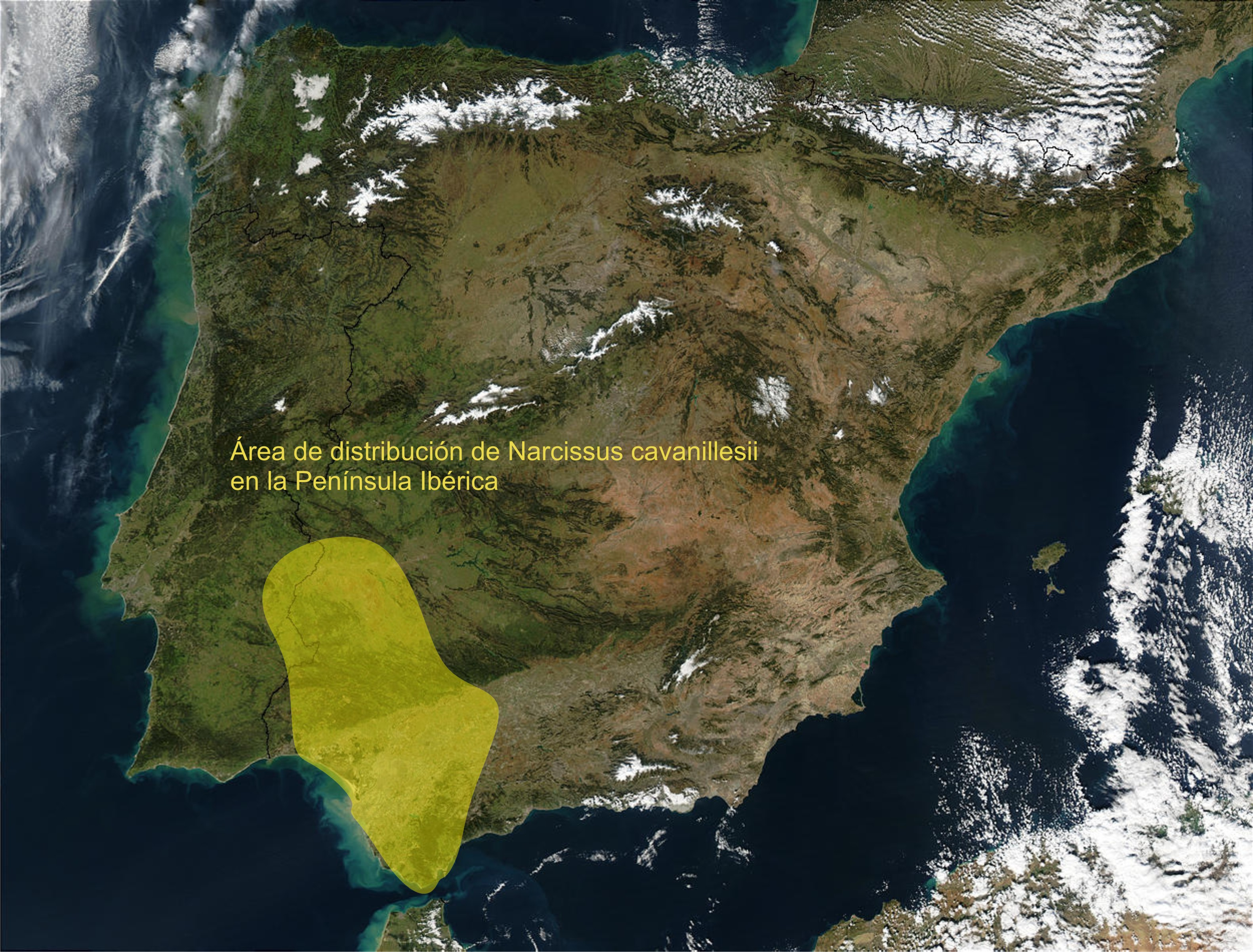
- Distribution range in the Iberian Peninsula

Synonyms
- Braxireon humile Raf.; Carregnoa humilis J.Gay; Narcissus humilis Traub; Pancratium humile Cav.; Tapeinaegle humilis Herb.; Tapeinanthus humilis Herb.

= Narcissus cavanillesii =

Species of daffodil

Narcissus cavanillesii is a species of Narcissus (daffodils) in the family Amaryllidaceae native to the Iberian Peninsula and Northwest Africa. It is classified in section Tapeinanthus, of which it is the sole member. Formerly, it was classified as a separate genus, Tapeinanthus.

== Description ==
Narcissus cavanillesii is a bulbous plant, 8–18 cm (3.1–7.1 in) tall. Unlike the remaining species of Narcissus, the corona is almost completely absent, which was why it was formerly classified as a separate genus.

== Distribution and habitat ==
Narcissus cavanillesii is native to the southwest Iberian Peninsula and Northwest Africa (in Morocco, south to Agadir, and Algeria) and inhabits forest clearings, scrublands, Mediterranean pastures, riparian communities and road edges in sub-humid Mediterranean climates from sea level up to 730 m (2,400 ft) a.s.l., occasionally 1,000 m (3,300 ft).
