= Mumba (gorilla) =

Western lowland gorilla (c.1960–2008)

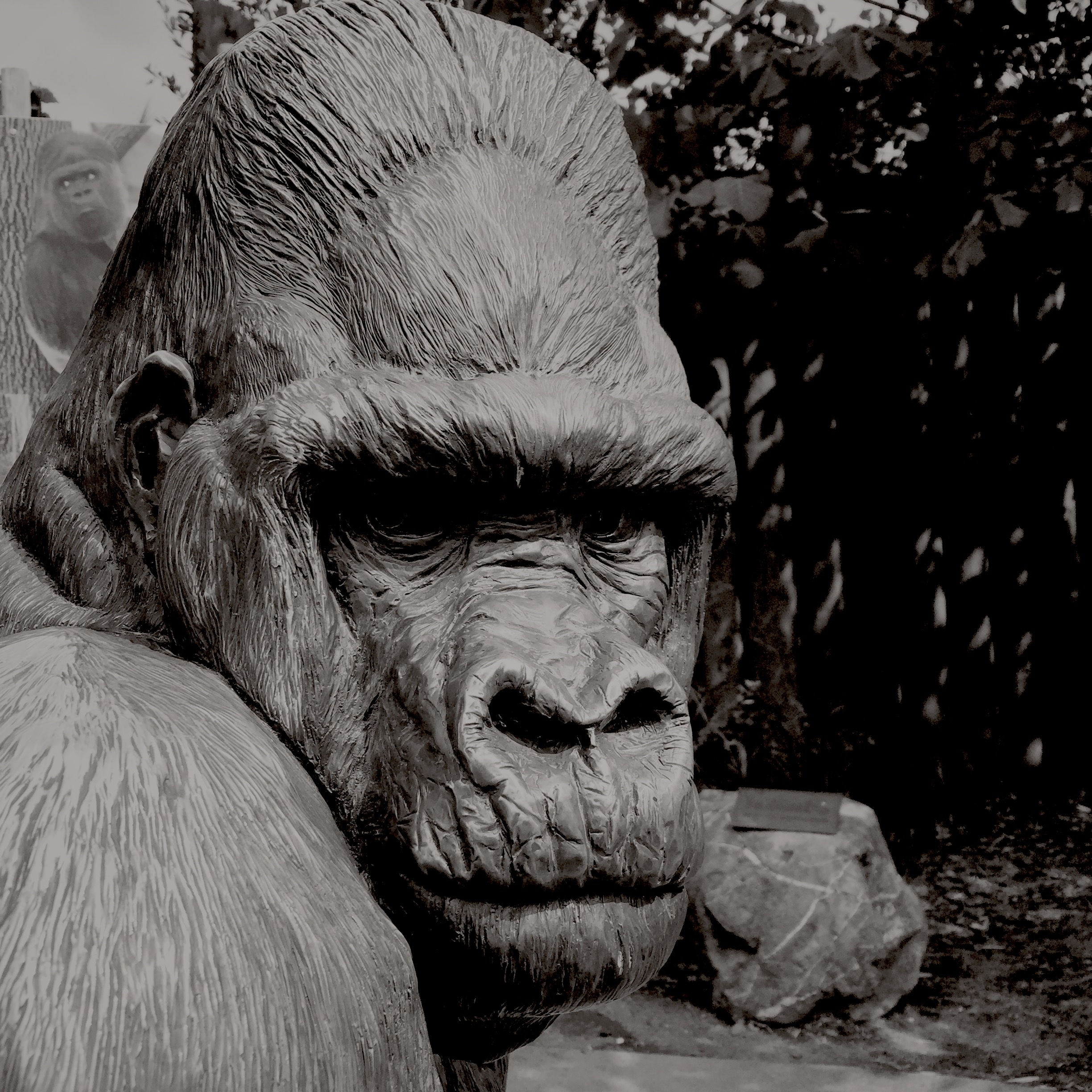
- Statue of Mumba at Granby Zoo
- Species: Gorilla gorilla gorilla
- Sex: male
- Born: c. 1960; Africa
- Died: October 2008 (aged 48); Granby, Quebec, Canada
- Residence: Granby Zoo
- Weight: 216 kg (476 lb)
- Height: 1.83 m (6 ft 0 in)

Mumba (c. 1960–October 2008) was a western lowland gorilla from Africa who was taken to Canada as an infant. Initially raised by a human family, he spent much of his life at Granby Zoo in Quebec, Canada. He never mated or produced offspring, despite many attempts from zookeepers to facilitate his reproduction. At the time of his death he was believed to be around 48 years old, which made him one of the oldest male gorillas in North America. His remains were taxidermied and stored in the Canadian Museum of Nature.

== Description ==
=== Personality ===
Mumba was known for his fondness for other humans and his lack of interest in other gorillas. When he was young he showed few signs of wanting to socialize with members of his own species, but in the final years of his life he became more relaxed around them. However, he never mated or expressed any romantic or sexual interest, and would rebuff potential suitors. Zookeepers attributed his lack of interest to the fact that he had been raised in a human family, and floated plans to freeze his tissue and clone him as an alternative to breeding him. They also collected his sperm to attempt artificial insemination, but discovered he had a low sperm count. As a wild-born gorilla, Mumba was unrelated to most captive-born gorillas, and he would have helped limit potential population bottlenecks.

Mumba liked eating yogurt, fruits and vegetables such as avocados and bananas, drinking tea, watching Scooby Doo and listening to music. In 2005, Mumba was reported to be 477 pounds (216 kg) and over 6 ft (1.8 m) tall. In 2008, he was approximately 410 pounds (190 kg).

=== Age ===
Mumba was believed to be one of the oldest gorillas in the world 2005. In 2004, he was to be the second oldest captive silverback. Mumba's birthday was celebrated each year at Granby Zoo. During his 45th birthday in July 2005, which was celebrated with a cake sized for 450 people, zookeepers believed him to be one of the oldest gorillas in North America. For his 46th birthday, they erected a bronze statue of Mumba on zoo grounds. The statue was designed by Denis Gagnon.

== Life ==
Mumba was born in Cameroon or the Congo. He was poached and taken to Canada in 1961, when he was between fifteen months and two years old. The first gorilla to be imported into Canada, he initially lived with a local family. They bottle-fed him, and he used diapers, ate with utensils, and made appearances on TV shows. At one point, he was a member of the Quebec Performing Arts Union. After growing too big for his human family to care for him, and after locking his foster mother in a cage, he was returned to Granby Zoo at the age of two and a half years and housed in their Primate Pavilion. For the first several months, Mumba's foster mother had to visit the zoo at Mumba's mealtimes, or else he would not eat.

In 1988, due to concerns over animal welfare, the zoo decided to close the Primate Pavilion and relocate all the primates to allow for renovations. Mumba was the only primate to stay at the zoo, after Granby zookeepers were unable to find a zoo willing to house him.

In the later years of his life, Mumba suffered from arthritis and Parkinson's disease. At one point, Mumba's mobility was so limited that zookeepers thought he might have had a stroke. Zookeepers tried a variety of remedies for his arthritis, including glucosamine, chondroitin sulfate, and devil's claw supplements, Tahitian Noni Juice, and rofecoxib and celecoxib injections. In 2003, due to his worsening arthritis, the Granby Zoo considered euthanizing him but by 2004, the severity of his symptoms had lessened.

In 2006, Mumba and his penmate, a 26 year old male gorilla called Leo, were joined by three young male gorillas from the Calgary Zoo: N'sabi, Jawara, and Zwalani. Zookeepers were worried the new arrivals could cause tension, and attributed some changes in Mumba's behaviour to the younger gorillas. Mumba retired from public life in 2007.

== Death and legacy ==
Mumba died in October 2008. At the time of his death, he was believed to be around 48 years of age. This made him one of the oldest male gorillas in captivity in North America. His remains were taxidermied and stored at the Canadian Museum of Nature's Museum's Research and Collections building in Aylmer. These plans had been made before Mumba's death; the zoo generally displayed the skeletons of deceased animals, but the director of animal care said that "the employees are too attached to [Mumba] to keep [his body] here".

In 2019, Granby Zoo named a room after Mumba.

== See also ==
- Oldest gorillas
- List of individual apes
