= Jean Boivin the Younger =

French writer, scholar and translator

Jean Boivin the Younger or Jean Boivin de Villeneuve (1 September 1663 in Montreuil-l'Argillé, Province of Normandy, France – 29 October 1726 in Paris) was a French writer, scholar and translator.

Jean was the younger brother of Louis Boivin. After their father died in 1762, Louis made [Jean] came to Paris the following year, and would not share with anyone the care of raising and teaching [Jean]". His teaching method was bizarre but fruitful – he locked his student up in a galetas with a copy of Homer, a dictionary and a grammar and would not let him out until he could explain an agreed number of verses from it in French and Latin.

In 1692, Jean Boivin became garde of the king's library, where he made an important discovery of an ancient 4th or 5th century biblical text in uncial script later that same year, included in a manuscript of the homilies of saint Ephrem the Syrian. He acquired a scholarly reputation by publishing in Latin texts by the major mathematicians of antiquity and he was made a professor at the Collège royal, where he held the ancient Greek chair from 1706 to 1726. He translated Nicephorus Gregoras and Pierre Pithou, as well as Aristophanes, Homer and Sophocles, and wrote his own Greek poetry. He was elected a member of the Académie royale des inscriptions et belles-lettres in 1705, and of the Académie Française in 1721.

== Works ==
- Veterum mathematicorum Athenaei, Apollodori, Philonis, Bitonis, Heronis et allorum opera graece et latine (1693)
- Nicephori Gregorae Byzantina historia, graece et latine (Byzantine history by Nicephorus Gregoras, 1702)
- Petri Pithoei vita, elogia, opera, bibliotheca (life and works by Pierre Pithou, 1711)
- Apologie d'Homère, et Bouclier d'Achille (1715). Republished : Slatkine, Genève, 1970.
- Batrachomyomachie d'Homère, ou Combat des rats et des grenouilles en vers françois (1717)
- Œdipe, tragédie de Sophocle, et les Oiseaux, comédie d'Aristophane (1729)
