= Martin Wolf (physicist) =

German experimental physicist

Karl Martin Wolf (born 1961) is a German experimental physicist specializing in electron and optical spectroscopy and their use for studying the dynamical processes in solid state materials, surfaces, and interfaces. He is the current director of the Department of Physical Chemistry at the Fritz Haber Institute of the Max Planck Society in Berlin, Germany.

== Education and career ==
Wolf was born in Berlin and earned his PhD in experimental physics from the Fritz Haber Institute of the Max Planck Society and the Free University of Berlin in 1991 under the supervision of Gerhard Ertl. After completing his PhD, he spent a year as a postdoc at the University of Texas at Austin in the group of Mike White before returning to the Fritz Haber Institute as a member of the research staff in 1992. He was a visiting scientist at IBM Yorktown Heights in the group headed by Tony Heinz in 1993.

In 1998, Wolf received his habilitation in experimental physics from the Free University of Berlin, and in 2000 he became a full professor in the Department of Physics. He has held this position for about a decade, and in 2008 he was appointed as the director of the Department of Physical Chemistry at the Fritz Haber Institute as a successor of the Nobel laureate Gerhard Ertl.

== Honors and awards ==
Wolf has received numerous awards and fellowships throughout his career. In 1991, he was awarded the Carl Ramsauer Prize by AEG and the Feodor Lynen Fellowship by the Alexander von Humboldt Foundation. In 1992, he received the Reimar Lüst Stipend from the Max Planck Society, and in 1993 he was awarded a research fellowship from the Arthur von Gwinner Foundation. In 1999, he was awarded the Heisenberg Stipend by the German Research Foundation, and in 1998 he received the Karl Scheel Prize from the German Physical Society.

Wolf has been honored with two honorary professorships, one from the Free University of Berlin in 2011 and another from Technische Universität Berlin in 2010. These appointments recognize his exceptional contributions to experimental physics and reflect his standing as one of the leading researchers in his field.
