= Louis Boivin =

Louis Boivin (1649–1724) was a French writer and the elder brother of Jean Boivin the Younger.

== Life ==
A member of the Académie des inscriptions, he wrote Mémoires sur la Chronologie in which, according to the Dictionnaire Bouillet he jumped too easily to his derivations.
