= Ricarda Winkelmann =

Germany climatologist

Ricarda Winkelmann (born 1985) is a German mathematician, physicist, and climatologist. She is a professor of Climate System Analysis at Potsdam University and the Potsdam-Institute for Climate Impact Research. She studies interdependencies between climate, land ice, and the ocean.

She is the 2017 winner of the Karl Scheel Prize.

Since July 1, 2023 she is founding director of the Max Planck Institute for Geoanthropology

== Education ==
Winkelmann has a PhD in physics from Potsdam Institute for Climate Impact Research (PIK). The title of her dissertation was "The Future Sea-Level Contribution from Antarctica - Projections of Solid Ice Discharge". where she studied sea levels.

In 2010-11 she took part in scientific expeditions to Antarctica aboard the research vessel Polarstern, operated by the Alfred-Wegener-Institute. In 2013 and 2014, she worked as a post-doc at the Stanford University's Carnegie Institution for Science and at PIK.

She won the German Physical Society's Karl Scheel Prize in 2017 for her work on the impact of climate change on sea levels and the Antarctic ice sheet.

== Career ==
Since 2010, she developed the Parallel Ice Sheet Model (PISM) which is available as an Open-Source-Software model of the ice sheet. Since 2020, Winkelmann is professor of climate system analysis at the University of Potsdam.

In 2017, she won the European Geosciences Union's Outstanding Early Career Scientist Award for her work linking glaciology and climate change.

== Publications ==
- Winkelmann et al, Combustion of available fossil fuel resources sufficient to eliminate the Antarctic Ice Sheet, 2015, Science Advances, Vol 1, Issue 8, DOI: 10.1126/sciadv.1500589
- Winkelmann et al, Trajectories of the Earth System in the Anthropocene, 2018 https://doi.org/10.1073/pnas.1810141115 (2,000+ citations)
- Winkelmann et al, The Hysteresis of the Antarctic Ice Sheet, 2020, Nature DOI: 10.1038/s41586-020-2727-5.,
- Winkelmann et al, Projected land ice contributions to twenty-first-century sea level rise, 2021, Nature, DOI: 10.1038/s41586-021-03302-y.
