= Pierre-Horace Boivin =

Mayor of Granby, Quebec, Canada

Pierre-Horace Boivin CC, CQ

Personal details
- Occupation: Mayor

Pierre-Horace Boivin (24 September 1905 in Granby, Quebec – 17 May 1994) was a Quebec politician. He was mayor of Granby from 1939 to 1964. He was also the founder of the Granby Zoo, the largest zoo in Québec. In 1967 he was awarded the Order of Canada and In 1994, he was appointed a Knight of the National Order of Quebec.

Boivin studied at the Sacré-Cœur College and at the Saint Louis College in Montreal. He and his wife Frances had 11 children.

He received an honorary doctorate from the University of Sherbrooke.

== Granby Zoo ==
In June of 1945 the city decided to transform Avery Park into a zoo. Horace Boivin took the initiative to keep wild and domestic animals in the yard of his residence located on Dufferin Street. The zoo then housed five white-tailed deer, three elk, three bison, two black bears, and other small animals.

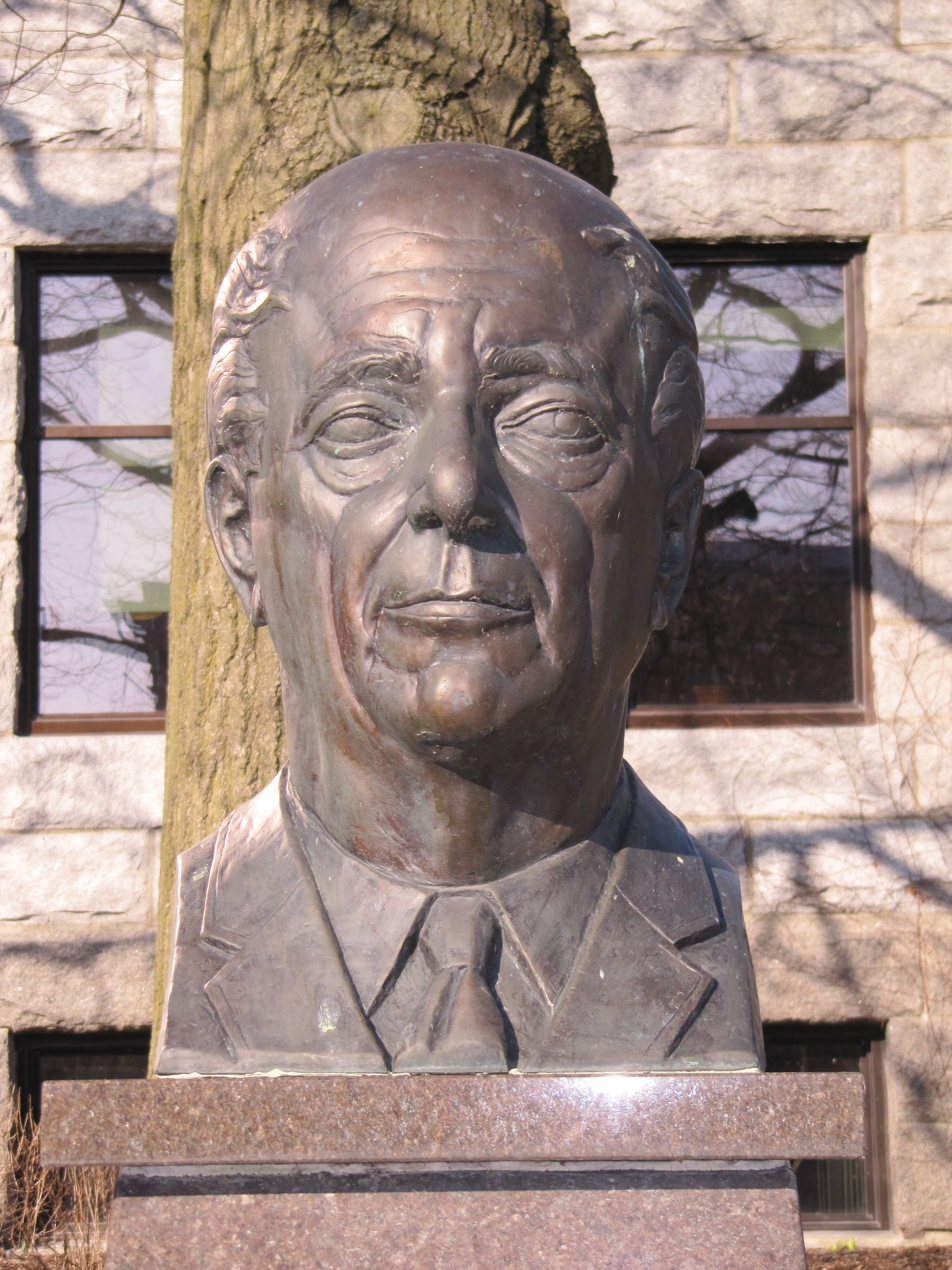
Bust of Pierre-Horace Boivin in front of Granby City Hall.

== Distinctions ==
- 1967 - Officer of the Order Canada
- 1994 - Knight of the National Order of Québec
