= Olga Smirnova (scientist) =

Physicist and Professor

- Born: July 12, 1973 (age 53); Moscow
- Education: Moscow State University
- Scientific career
- Fields: Physics
- Workplaces: Technische Universität Berlin; Vienna University of Technology

Olga Smirnova is a German physicist who is Head of the Strong Field Theory Group at the Max Born Institute for Nonlinear Optics and Short Pulse Spectroscopy and Professor at Technische Universität Berlin. Her research considers the interaction of strong fields with atoms and molecules.

== Early life and education ==
Smirnova was born in Moscow. She started her undergraduate career studying physics at the Moscow State University. After earning her doctorate in 2000, Smirnova became an assistant professor at the Moscow State University, and interested in attosecond physics. In 2003 she moved to Vienna University of Technology (TU Wien) as a Lise Meitner Fellow. After two years in Vienna, Smirnova joined the theoretical group at the National Research Council Canada in the Steacie Institute for Molecular Science. In 2006 she was made a permanent member of staff at the Steacie Institute.

== Research and career ==
In 2009, Smirnova moved to the Max Born Institute for Nonlinear Optics and Short Pulse Spectroscopy, Berlin, where she launched her own research group studying ultrafast photonics. In particular, Smrinova is interested in imaging the structures and dynamics of molecular assemblies. The movement of electrons that occurs during chemical reactions happens at the attosecond time-scale. The ultrafast measurements performed by Smirnovoa make use of strong infrared fields to liberate electrons from molecules. Smrinova then images the motion of these electrons via their recollsion. Recollision describes the movement of these oscillating, liberated electrons back to their parent ions, resulting in elastic and inelastic scattering (i.e. diffraction imaging) as well as radiative recombination (i.e. the emission of XUV light). Smirnova was promoted to full Professor at Technische Universität Berlin in 2016.

Smirnova has developed new approaches to differentiate between left- and right-handed molecular enantiomers. Smirnova induces chiral dynamics in the molecular systems and probes them using a chiral experimental set-up. She introduces locally chiral electronic fields that can be tuned to excite enantiomers of a specific handedness. Synthetic chiral light can be manipulated to allow control of the intensity, polarisation and propagation of the optical response on randomly arranged chiral molecules.

== Awards and honours ==
- 2022 ERC Advanced Grant
- 2019 American Chemical Society Ahmed Zewail Award in Ultrafast Science & Technology
- 2010 Deutsche Physikalische Gesellschaft Karl-Scheel-Preis
- 2009 Leibniz Competition Award SAW award

== Selected publications ==
- Olga Smirnova; Yann Mairesse; Serguei Patchkovskii; Nirit Dudovich; David Villeneuve; Paul Corkum; Misha Yu Ivanov (22 July 2009). "High harmonic interferometry of multi-electron dynamics in molecules". Nature. 460 (7258): 972–977. doi:10.1038/nature08253. ISSN 1476-4687. PMID 19626004. Wikidata Q33485824.
- Y Huismans; A Rouzée; A Gijsbertsen; et al. (16 December 2010). "Time-resolved holography with photoelectrons". Science. 331 (6013): 61–64. Bibcode:2011Sci...331...61H. doi:10.1126/science.1198450. ISSN 0036-8075. PMID 21163963. Wikidata Q33773204.
- Dror Shafir; Hadas Soifer; Barry D. Bruner; et al. (16 May 2012). "Resolving the time when an electron exits a tunnelling barrier". Nature. 485 (7398): 343–346. Bibcode:2012Natur.485..343S. doi:10.1038/nature11025. ISSN 1476-4687. PMID 22596157. Wikidata Q34273058.
