= Nicole Boivin =

Canadian archaeologist

Nicole Boivin FSA
- Citizenship: Canadian
- Occupation: Archaeologist

Academic background
- Education: University of Cambridge
- Thesis: "Archaeological Science as Anthropology": Space, Time and Materiality in Rural India and the Ancient Past (2001)

Academic work
- Discipline: Archaeological Science
- Sub-discipline: Archaeology
- Institutions: Max Planck Institute for the Science of Human History; Oxford University

Nicole Lise Boivin FSA is a Canadian archaeologist known for her interdisciplinary research on human history, including prehistoric migration and dispersal, Indian Ocean trade and biological exchange, and long-term human modification of environments. She is an Honorary Professor in the School of Social Science at the University of Queensland and an Adjunct Professor in the School of Environment at Griffith University. She leads a research group at the Max Planck Institute of Geoanthropology (formerly the Max Planck Institute for the Science of Human History), where she was previously a director.

== Education and career ==
Boivin has a BSc in cellular, molecular and microbial biology from the University of Calgary (1992), and an MPhil (1996) and PhD (2001) in archaeology from the University of Cambridge. Following her PhD, Boivin held a postdoctoral research fellowship at the McDonald Institute for Archaeological Research at Cambridge from 2002 to 2004, followed by a Fyssen Foundation postdoctoral research fellowship at the Maison de l'Archéologie et de l'ethnologue, Université de Paris X in 2005. She subsequently worked at the Leverhulme Centre for Human Evolutionary Studies in Cambridge (2006–2008).

Boivin subsequently moved to the University of Oxford, where she held a senior research fellowship in the School of Archaeology as well as a senior research fellowship at Jesus College. In the first round of European Research Council (ERC) funding in 2007, she was awarded a €1.2 million Starting Grant for an interdisciplinary programme investigating prehistoric maritime connectivity and biological exchange across the Indian Ocean.

In 2016, Boivin was appointed a director of the Max Planck Institute for the Science of Human History, where she established and led the Department of Archaeology until 2022. The department developed an international archaeological science programme investigating human mobility, biological and cultural exchange, and long-term human transformation of environments.

Since 2022, Boivin has led a research group at the Max Planck Institute for Geoanthropology. She was also appointed an Honorary Professor at the University of Queensland, an Adjunct Professor at Griffith University, and an Associate Researcher with the ARC Centre for Transforming Human Origins Research. Alongside her academic research, her recent work has addressed gender inequality, research governance and accountability in academia. She is also an advisor to the Academic Parity Movement.

== Controversy ==
In October 2021, she was removed from her position at the Max Planck Institute, after an investigation found evidence of "scientific misconduct and bullying". The full details of the case have not been made publicly available, but the summary of the findings includes "claiming credit for the work of others, and workplace bullying of institute staff and younger researchers". Concerns have also been expressed about misogyny at the Max Planck Society. In December 2021, a court in Berlin re-instated Boivin as a director, a decision which the Max Planck Society is appealing. In April 2022, she was removed a second time as director of the Max Planck Institute for the Science of Human History (MPI-SHH), following a vote by a governing board of the Max Planck Society. Boivin continues to dispute the decision and has openly criticised the lack of transparency in the disciplinary process at the society.

== Research ==
Boivin's research is multi-disciplinary, spanning the natural sciences and humanities. Her research includes investigating human migrations out of Africa in the Late Pleistocene, to maritime trade and biological exchange in the Indian Ocean during the last two thousand years. She was awarded a European Research Council starting grant (2007–2014) for the Sealinks project, which investigated the emergence of long-distance trade and connectivity in the Indian Ocean, and its relationship to processes of biological exchange and translocation. Her work examines long-term human history and the relationships between people and the environment on a global scale. At the Max Planck Institute for the Science of Human History, her Department's work explores the diverse ways that data about the past can inform modern day challenges including climate change, anthropogenic transformation of species and environments, and food security. Her research has been funded by the Wenner Gren Foundation, the Australian Research Council, the McDonald Institute for Archaeological Research, and the British Academy.

She is the author of Material Cultures, Material Minds: The Role of Things in Human Thought, Society and Evolution (published in 2009 by Cambridge University Press), and co-editor of several books including Human Dispersal and Species Movements: From Prehistory to the Present (2017, Cambridge University Press) and Globalisation and the ‘People without History’: Understanding Contact and Exchange in Prehistory (2018, Cambridge University Press), and Soils, Stones and Symbols: Cultural Perceptions of the Mineral World, published by Routledge in 2004.

== Awards ==
Boivin was recipient of the Prehistoric Society Bob Smith Award in 2002, the joint winner of the 2011 Antiquity Ben Cullen prize, and elected a Fellow of the Society of Antiquaries in 2013.

== Selected publications ==
- Boivin, N. & Fuller, D.Q. 2009. Shell middens, ships and seeds: Exploring coastal subsistence, maritime trade and the dispersal of domesticates in and around the ancient Arabian peninsula. Journal of World Prehistory 22: 113–180.
- Petraglia, M.D., Clarkson, C., Boivin, N., Haslam, M., Korisettar, R., Chaubey, G., Ditchfield, P., Fuller, D., James, H., Jones, S., Kivisild, T., Koshy, J., Lahr, M.M., Metspalu, M., Roberts, R. & Arnold, L. 2009. Population increase and environmental deterioration correspond with microlithic innovations in South Asia ca. 35,000 years ago. Proceedings of the National Academy of Sciences 106: 12261–12266.
- Boivin, Nicole (2010). Material cultures, material minds: the impact of things on human thought, society, and evolution. Cambridge ; New York: Cambridge University Press. ISBN 978-0-521-17613-2.
- Petraglia, M.D., Haslam, M., Fuller, D.Q. & Boivin, N. 2010. The southern dispersal route and the spread of modern humans along the Indian Ocean rim: New hypotheses and evidence. Annals of Human Biology 37(3): 288–311.
- Fuller, D.Q., Boivin, N., Hoogervorst, T. & Allaby, R. 2011. Across the Indian Ocean: The prehistoric movement of plants and animals. Antiquity 85: 544–558.
- Boivin, N., Fuller, D. & Crowther, A. 2012. Old World globalization and the Columbian Exchange: Comparison and contrast. World Archaeology 44(3): 452–69.
- Boivin, N., Fuller, D.Q., Dennell, R., Allaby, R. & Petraglia, D. 2013. Human dispersal across diverse environments of Asia during the Upper Pleistocene. Quaternary International 300: 32–47.
- Boivin, N., Täuber, S., Beisiegel, U., Keller U. & Hering J.G. 2023. Sexism in academia is bad for science and a waste of public funding. Nature Reviews Materials https://doi.org/10.1038/s41578-023-00624-3
