= Johann-Mattis List =

German scientist

- Born: July 16, 1981 (age 45); Kassel, Germany

Academic background
- Education: Heinrich Heine University Düsseldorf
- Thesis: Sequence Comparison in Historical Linguistics (2013)

Academic work
- Discipline: Linguistics
- Sub-discipline: Computational linguistics; Historical linguistics
- Institutions: Max Planck Institute for Evolutionary Anthropology
- Notable works: Concepticon
- Website: lingulist.de

Johann-Mattis List (born 16 July 1981 in Kassel, Germany) is a German scientist. He is known for his work on quantitative comparative linguistics. List is currently professor at the University of Passau, Germany, where he leads the Chair of Multilingual Computational Linguistics.

== Education ==
List graduated summa cum laude from Heinrich Heine University Düsseldorf in 2013. He completed his habilitation from the University of Jena in 2021, where he completed a dissertation titled Computer-Assisted Approaches to Historical Language Comparison.

== Career ==
Throughout much of his research career, List has worked on projects such as Cross-Linguistic Linked Data (CLLD), Lexibank, and the Automated Similarity Judgment Program (ASJP). He has also co-authored various papers on computational language phylogeny, including on the Sino-Tibetan languages, and has introduced the concept of incomplete lineage sorting in historical linguistics.
