= Swadesh list =

Compilation of concepts primarily for the purposes of lexicostatistics

A Swadesh list (/ˈswɑːdɛʃ/) is a compilation of tentatively universal concepts for the purposes of lexicostatistics. That is, a Swadesh list is a list of forms and concepts which all languages, without exception, have terms for, such as star, hand, water, kill, sleep, and so forth. The number of such terms is small – a few hundred at most, or possibly less than a hundred. The inclusion or exclusion of many terms is subject to debate among linguists; thus, there are several different lists, and some authors may refer to "Swadesh lists." The Swadesh list is named after linguist Morris Swadesh.

Translations of a Swadesh list into a set of languages allow for researchers to quantify the interrelatedness of those languages. Swadesh lists are used in lexicostatistics (the quantitative assessment of the genealogical relatedness of languages) and glottochronology (the dating of language divergence). For instance, the terms on a Swadesh list can be compared between two languages (since both languages will have them) to see if they are related and how closely, thus giving useful information that can be further applied to comparison of the languages. (Actual lexicostatistics is quite complicated, and usually sets of languages are compared.)

== Versions and authors ==
Morris Swadesh created several versions of his list. He started with a list of 215 meanings (falsely introduced as a list of 225 meanings in the paper due to a spelling error), which he reduced to 165 words for the Salish-Spokane-Kalispel language. In 1952, he published a list of 215 meanings, of which he suggested the removal of 16 for being unclear or not universal, with one added to arrive at 200 words. In 1955, he wrote, "The only solution appears to be a drastic weeding out of the list, in the realization that quality is at least as important as quantity. Even the new list has defects, but they are relatively mild and few in number." After minor corrections, the final 100-word list was published posthumously in 1971 and 1972.

Other versions of lexicostatistical test lists were published e.g. by Robert Lees (1953), John A. Rea (1958:145f), Dell Hymes (1960:6), E. Cross (1964 with 241 concepts), W. J. Samarin (1967:220f), D. Wilson (1969 with 57 meanings), Lionel Bender (1969), R. L. Oswald (1971), Winfred P. Lehmann (1984:35f), D. Ringe (1992, passim, different versions), Sergei Starostin (1984, passim, different versions), William S-Y. Wang (1994), M. Lohr (2000, 128 meanings in 18 languages). B. Kessler (2002), and many others. The Concepticon, a project hosted at the Cross-Linguistic Linked Data (CLLD) project, collects various concept lists (including classical Swadesh lists) across different linguistic areas and times, currently listing 240 different concept lists.

Frequently used and widely available on the internet, is the version by Isidore Dyen (1992, 200 meanings of 95 language variants). Since 2010, a team around Michael Dunn has tried to update and enhance that list.

== Principle ==
In origin, the words in the Swadesh lists were chosen for their universal, culturally independent availability in as many languages as possible, regardless of their stability (how prone the word is to changing, as all words do over time to a greater or lesser extent, which can include borrowing from another language).

However, stability may be important. The stability of terms on a Swadesh list under language change and the potential use of this fact for purposes of glottochronology (study of how languages develop and branch apart over time) have been analyzed by numerous authors, including Marisa Lohr 1999, 2000.

The Swadesh list was put together by Morris Swadesh on the basis of his intuition. Similar more recent lists, such as the Dolgopolsky list (1964) or the Leipzig–Jakarta list (2009), are based on systematic data from many different languages, but they are not yet as widely known nor as widely used as the Swadesh list.

== Usage in lexicostatistics and glottochronology ==
Lexicostatistical test lists are used in lexicostatistics to define subgroupings of languages, and in glottochronology to "provide dates for branching points in the tree." The task of defining (and counting the number) of cognate words in the list is far from trivial, and often is subject to dispute, because cognates do not necessarily look similar, and recognition of cognates presupposes knowledge of the sound laws of the respective languages.

== Swadesh 100 original final list ==
Swadesh's final list, published in 1971, contains 100 terms. Explanations of the terms can be found in Swadesh 1952 or, where noted by a dagger (^{†}), in Swadesh 1955. Note that only this original sequence clarifies the correct meaning which is lost in an alphabetical order, e.g., in the case "27. bark" (originally without the specification here added).

1. I (first person singular pronoun)
2. you (second person singular pronoun; 1952: thou & ye)
3. we (1955: inclusive)
4. this
5. that
6. who? (“?” not 1971)
7. what? (“?” not 1971)
8. not
9. all (of a number)
10. many
11. one
12. two
13. big
14. long (not wide)
15. small
16. woman
17. man (adult male human)
18. person (individual human)
19. fish (noun)
20. bird
21. dog
22. louse
23. tree (not log)
24. seed (noun)
25. leaf (botanics)
26. root (botanics)
27. bark (of tree)
28. skin (1952: person’s)
29. flesh (1952: meat, flesh)
30. blood
31. bone
32. grease (1952: fat, organic substance)
33. egg
34. horn (of bull etc., not 1952)^{†}
35. tail
36. feather (large, not down)
37. hair (on head of humans)
38. head (anatomic)
39. ear
40. eye
41. nose
42. mouth
43. tooth (front, rather than molar)
44. tongue (anatomical)
45. claw (not in 1952)^{†}^{1}
46. foot (not leg)
47. knee (not 1952)^{†}
48. hand
49. belly (lower part of body, abdomen)
50. neck (not nape)
51. breast
52. heart
53. liver
54. drink (verb)
55. eat (verb)
56. bite (verb)
57. see (verb)
58. hear (verb)
59. know (facts)
60. sleep (verb)
61. die (verb)
62. kill (verb)
63. swim (verb)
64. fly (verb)
65. walk (verb)
66. come (verb)
67. lie (on side, recline)
68. sit (verb)
69. stand (verb)
70. give (verb)
71. say (verb)^{†}
72. sun
73. moon (not 1952)^{†}
74. star
75. water (noun)
76. rain (noun, 1952: verb)
77. stone
78. sand
79. earth (soil)
80. cloud (not fog)
81. smoke (noun, of fire)
82. fire
83. ash(es)
84. burn (verb intransitive)
85. path (1952: road, trail; not street)
86. mountain (not hill)
87. red (color)
88. green (color)
89. yellow (color)
90. white (color)
91. black (color)
92. night
93. hot (adjective; 1952: warm, of weather)
94. cold (of weather)
95. full^{†}
96. new
97. good
98. round (not 1952)^{†}
99. dry (substance)
100. name

"Claw" was only added in 1955, but again replaced by many well-known specialists with (finger)nail, because expressions for "claw" are not available in many old, extinct, or lesser known languages.

The 110-item Global Lexicostatistical Database list uses the original 100-item Swadesh list, in addition to 10 other words from the Swadesh–Yakhontov list.

== Swadesh 207 list ==
The most used list nowadays is the Swadesh 207-word list, adapted from Swadesh 1952.

In Wiktionary ("Swadesh lists by language"), Panlex and in Palisto's "Swadesh Word List of Indo-European languages", hundreds of Swadesh lists in this form can be found.

1. I
2. you (singular)
3. he
4. we
5. you (plural)
6. they
7. this
8. that
9. here
10. there
11. who
12. what
13. where
14. when
15. how
16. not
17. all
18. many
19. some
20. few
21. other
22. one
23. two
24. three
25. four
26. five
27. big
28. long
29. wide
30. thick
31. heavy
32. small
33. short
34. narrow
35. thin
36. woman
37. man (adult male)
38. man (human being)
39. child
40. wife
41. husband
42. mother
43. father
44. animal
45. fish
46. bird
47. dog
48. louse
49. snake
50. worm
51. tree
52. forest
53. stick
54. fruit
55. seed
56. leaf
57. root
58. bark (of a tree)
59. flower
60. grass
61. rope
62. skin
63. meat
64. blood
65. bone
66. fat (noun)
67. egg
68. horn
69. tail
70. feather
71. hair
72. head
73. ear
74. eye
75. nose
76. mouth
77. tooth
78. tongue (organ)
79. fingernail
80. foot
81. leg
82. knee
83. hand
84. wing
85. belly
86. guts
87. neck
88. back
89. breast
90. heart
91. liver
92. to drink
93. to eat
94. to bite
95. to suck
96. to spit
97. to vomit
98. to blow
99. to breathe
100. to laugh
101. to see
102. to hear
103. to know
104. to think
105. to smell
106. to fear
107. to sleep
108. to live
109. to die
110. to kill
111. to fight
112. to hunt
113. to hit
114. to cut
115. to split
116. to stab
117. to scratch
118. to dig
119. to swim
120. to fly
121. to walk
122. to come
123. to lie (as in a bed)
124. to sit
125. to stand
126. to turn (intransitive)
127. to fall
128. to give
129. to hold
130. to squeeze
131. to rub
132. to wash
133. to wipe
134. to pull
135. to push
136. to throw
137. to tie
138. to sew
139. to count
140. to say
141. to sing
142. to play
143. to float
144. to flow
145. to freeze
146. to swell
147. sun
148. moon
149. star
150. water
151. rain
152. river
153. lake
154. sea
155. salt
156. stone
157. sand
158. dust
159. earth
160. cloud
161. fog
162. sky
163. wind
164. snow
165. ice
166. smoke
167. fire
168. ash
169. to burn
170. road
171. mountain
172. red
173. green
174. yellow
175. white
176. black
177. night
178. day
179. year
180. warm
181. cold
182. full
183. new
184. old
185. good
186. bad
187. rotten
188. dirty
189. straight
190. round
191. sharp (as a knife)
192. dull (as a knife)
193. smooth
194. wet
195. dry
196. correct
197. near
198. far
199. right
200. left
201. at
202. in
203. with
204. and
205. if
206. because
207. name

== Shorter lists ==
The Swadesh–Yakhontov list is a 35-word subset of the Swadesh list posited as especially stable by Russian linguist Sergei Yakhontov around the 1960s, although the list was only officially published in 1991. It has been used in lexicostatistics by linguists such as Sergei Starostin. With their Swadesh numbers, they are:

1. I
2. you (singular)
7. this
11. who
12. what
22. one
23. two
45. fish
47. dog
48. louse
64. blood
65. bone
67. egg
68. horn
69. tail
73. ear
74. eye
75. nose
77. tooth
78. tongue
83. hand
103. know
109. die
128. give
147. sun
148. moon
150. water
155. salt
156. stone
163. wind
167. fire
179. year
182. full
183. new
207. name

Holman et al. (2008) found that in identifying the relationships between Chinese dialects the Swadesh–Yakhontov list was less accurate than the original Swadesh-100 list. Further they found that a different (40-word) list (also known as the ASJP list) was just as accurate as the Swadesh-100 list. However, they calculated the relative stability of the words by comparing retentions between languages in established language families. They found no statistically significant difference in the correlations in the families of the Old versus the New World.

The ranked Swadesh-100 list, with Swadesh numbers and relative stability, is as follows (Holman et al., Appendix. Asterisked words appear on the 40-word list):

1. 22 *louse (42.8)
2. 12 *two (39.8)
3. 75 *water (37.4)
4. 39 *ear (37.2)
5. 61 *die (36.3)
6. 1 *I (35.9)
7. 53 *liver (35.7)
8. 40 *eye (35.4)
9. 48 *hand (34.9)
10. 58 *hear (33.8)
11. 23 *tree (33.6)
12. 19 *fish (33.4)
13. 100 *name (32.4)
14. 77 *stone (32.1)
15. 43 *tooth (30.7)
16. 51 *breasts (30.7)
17. 2 *you (30.6)
18. 85 *path (30.2)
19. 31 *bone (30.1)
20. 44 *tongue (30.1)
21. 28 *skin (29.6)
22. 92 *night (29.6)
23. 25 *leaf (29.4)
24. 76 rain (29.3)
25. 62 kill (29.2)
26. 30 *blood (29.0)
27. 34 *horn (28.8)
28. 18 *person (28.7)
29. 47 *knee (28.0)
30. 11 *one (27.4)
31. 41 *nose (27.3)
32. 95 *full (26.9)
33. 66 *come (26.8)
34. 74 *star (26.6)
35. 86 *mountain (26.2)
36. 82 *fire (25.7)
37. 3 *we (25.4)
38. 54 *drink (25.0)
39. 57 *see (24.7)
40. 27 bark (24.5)
41. 96 *new (24.3)
42. 21 *dog (24.2)
43. 72 *sun (24.2)
44. 64 fly (24.1)
45. 32 grease (23.4)
46. 73 moon (23.4)
47. 70 give (23.3)
48. 52 heart (23.2)
49. 36 feather (23.1)
50. 90 white (22.7)
51. 89 yellow (22.5)
52. 20 bird (21.8)
53. 38 head (21.7)
54. 79 earth (21.7)
55. 46 foot (21.6)
56. 91 black (21.6)
57. 42 mouth (21.5)
58. 88 green (21.1)
59. 60 sleep (21.0)
60. 7 what (20.7)
61. 26 root (20.5)
62. 45 claw (20.5)
63. 56 bite (20.5)
64. 83 ash (20.3)
65. 87 red (20.2)
66. 55 eat (20.0)
67. 33 egg (19.8)
68. 6 who (19.0)
69. 99 dry (18.9)
70. 37 hair (18.6)
71. 81 smoke (18.5)
72. 8 not (18.3)
73. 4 this (18.2)
74. 24 seed (18.2)
75. 16 woman (17.9)
76. 98 round (17.9)
77. 14 long (17.4)
78. 69 stand (17.1)
79. 97 good (16.9)
80. 17 man (16.7)
81. 94 cold (16.6)
82. 29 flesh (16.4)
83. 50 neck (16.0)
84. 71 say (16.0)
85. 84 burn (15.5)
86. 35 tail (14.9)
87. 78 sand (14.9)
88. 5 that (14.7)
89. 65 walk (14.4)
90. 68 sit (14.3)
91. 10 many (14.2)
92. 9 all (14.1)
93. 59 know (14.1)
94. 80 cloud (13.9)
95. 63 swim (13.6)
96. 49 belly (13.5)
97. 13 big (13.4)
98. 93 hot (11.6)
99. 67 lie (11.2)
100. 15 small (6.3)

=== Sign languages ===
In studying the sign languages of Vietnam and Thailand, linguist James Woodward noted that the traditional Swadesh list applied to spoken languages was unsuited for sign languages. The Swadesh list results in overestimation of the relationships between sign languages, due to indexical signs such as pronouns and parts of the body. The modified list is as follows, in mostly alphabetical order:

1. all
2. animal
3. bad
4. because
5. bird
6. black
7. blood
8. child
9. count
10. day
11. die
12. dirty
13. dog
14. dry
15. dull
16. dust
17. earth
18. egg
19. grease
20. father
21. feather
22. fire
23. fish
24. flower
25. good
26. grass
27. green
28. heavy
29. how
30. hunt
31. husband
32. ice
33. if
34. kill
35. laugh
36. leaf
37. lie
38. live
39. long
40. louse
41. man
42. meat
43. mother
44. mountain
45. name
46. narrow
47. new
48. night
49. not
50. old
51. other
52. person
53. play
54. rain
55. red
56. correct
57. river
58. rope
59. salt
60. sea
61. sharp
62. short
63. sing
64. sit
65. smooth
66. snake
67. snow
68. stand
69. star
70. stone
71. sun
72. tail
73. thin
74. tree
75. vomit
76. warm
77. water
78. wet
79. what
80. when
81. where
82. white
83. who
84. wide
85. wife
86. wind
87. with
88. woman
89. wood
90. worm
91. year
92. yellow
93. full
94. moon
95. brother
96. cat
97. dance
98. pig
99. sister
100. work

== See also ==
- Other lists
  - A General Service List of English Words — roughly 2,000 of the most common English words
  - Dolgopolsky list — the 15 words that change least as languages evolve
  - Leipzig–Jakarta list — 100 words resistant to borrowing, used to estimate chronological separation of languages, intended to improve on the Swadesh list
  - Holle lists — about 1500 words in more than 250 languages of Indonesia
  - Wiktionary listings:
    - wikt:Appendix:Swadesh lists
    - wikt:Category:Swadesh lists by language
- Projects and databases
  - Automated Similarity Judgment Program — a project applying computational approaches to comparative linguistics using a database of word lists
  - Evolution of Human Languages — a project to provide a genealogical classification of the world's languages
  - Intercontinental Dictionary Series — a database of vocabulary lists in over 200 languages, especially indigenous South American and Northeast Caucasian
- Linguistic concepts and fields
  - Cognate — a word derived from the same word as another
  - Historical linguistics — the study of language change over time
  - Indo-European studies — the study of Indo-European languages and their hypothetical common ancestor, Proto-Indo-European
  - Proto-language — a postulated ancestral language from which a family of languages is presumed to have evolved
- Methods of language reconstruction
  - Comparative method — feature-by-feature comparison of related languages to reconstruct their development and common ancestor
  - Mass lexical comparison — a controversial method, seen as a rival to the comparative method, to determine the relatedness of languages
  - Internal reconstruction — reconstruction of an earlier state of a language without comparing it to other languages
- Other
  - Basic English — a simplified form of English for communication and learning
