= PHOIBLE =

Linguistic database

PHOIBLE logo

PHOIBLE (short for "Phonetics Information Base and Lexicon") is a linguistic database accessible through its website and compiling phonological inventories from primary documents and tertiary databases into a single, easily searchable sample. The 2019 version 2.0 includes 3,020 inventories containing 3,183 segment types found in 2,186 distinct languages. It is edited by Steven Moran, Assistant Professor from the Institute of Biology at the University of Neuchâtel and Daniel McCloy, Researcher at the Institute for Learning and Brain Sciences at the University of Washington.

== Principles of PHOIBLE ==
Rather than imposing a single system of describing languages, PHOIBLE attempts to be faithful to the various description methods found in source documents, the varieties in which are distinguished as "doculects", and to encode all character data in a consistent representation according to the Unicode IPA.

Its data is published under the Creative Commons Attribution-ShareAlike 3.0 licence (CC BY-SA 3.0).

== Organisation of the database ==
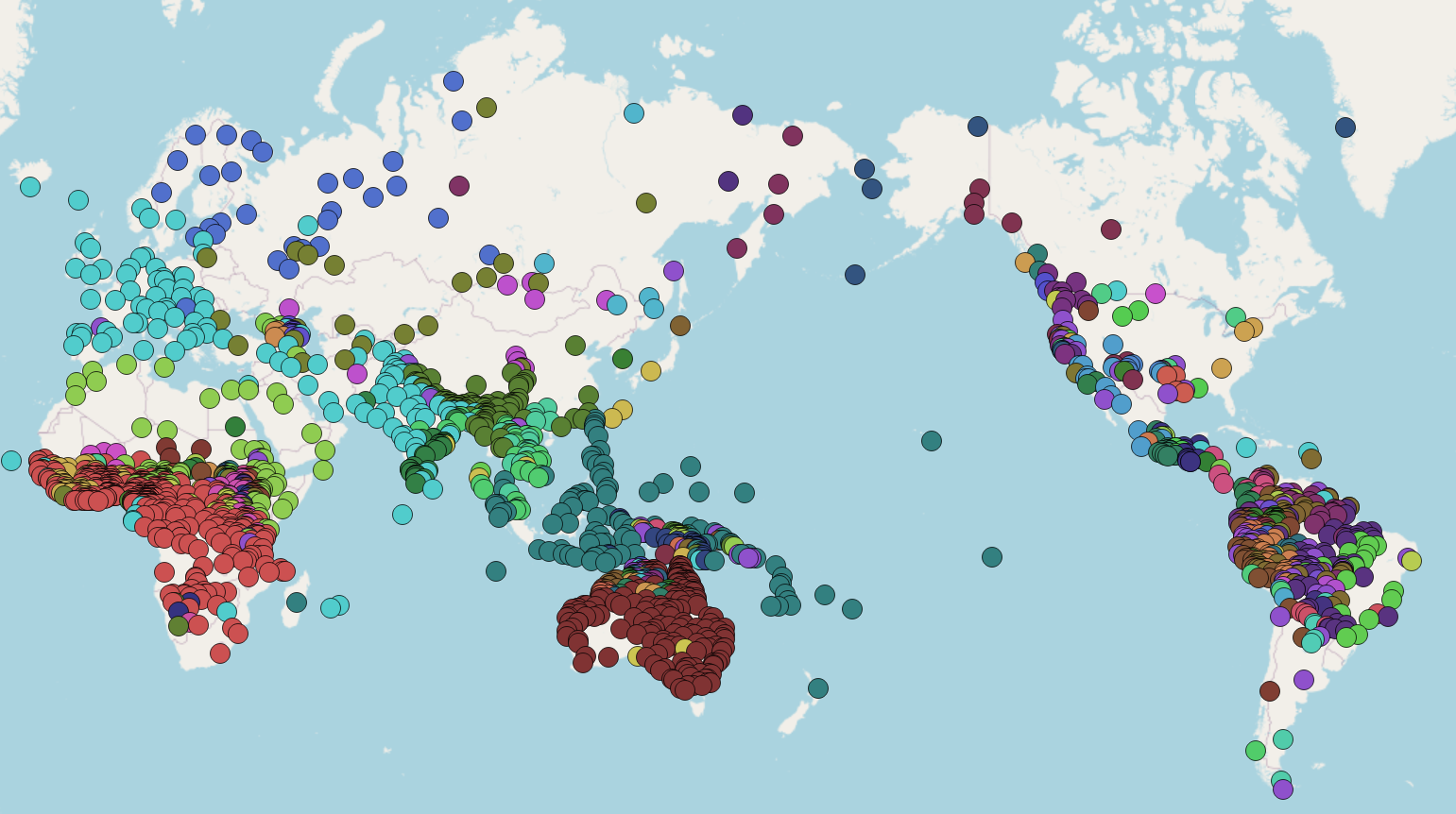
Map of the languages listed on PHOIBLE 2.0.

The website is very similar to those of Glottolog, WALS and APiCS.

Since the release of PHOIBLE 2.0 in 2019, the data is taken from the Cross-Linguistic Data Formats (CLDF) dataset of the Cross-Linguistic Linked Data (CLLD) project.

The languages are classified by family, geographical coordinates and world regions (Africa, North and South America, Australia, Eurasia and Papunesia).

The individual language pages include geographical information from Glottolog, with a link to its site with the glottocode of the language, and another with the ISO 639-3 code pointing to that of SIL. They also include links to one or more phoneme inventories, with associated bibliographic records for each source. Multiple entries are based on separate sources that disagree on the number and/or identity of phonemes in the language.

In addition to phoneme inventories, PHOIBLE includes distinctive feature data for each phoneme in each language. This system is loosely based on Hayes' Introductory Phonology with some additions from Moisik and Esling's The 'whole larynx' approach to laryngeal features, but may change as new languages are added.

A subset of 451 languages in PHOIBLE comes from the UCLA Phonological Segment Inventory Database (UPSID), whose author, Ian Maddieson, is a contributor to the chapter on phonology in WALS.

== Bibliography ==
- Forkel, Robert (February 14, 2019). "PHOIBLE 2.0 released". clld.org. Cross-Linguistic Linked Data.
- Hayes, Bruce (2011). Introductory Phonology (PDF). Blackwell. ISBN 9781444360134.
- List, Johann-Mattis; Forkel, Robert; Greenhill, Simon J.; Rzymski, Christoph; Englisch, Johannes; Russell D., Russell D. (16 June 2022). "Lexibank, a public repository of standardized wordlists with computed phonological and lexical features" (PDF). Scientific Data. 9 (316). doi:10.1038/s41597-022-01432-0. ISSN 2052-4463. S2CID 239629792.
- Moisik, Scott R.; Esling, John H. (2011). The 'whole larynx' approach to laryngeal features (PDF). ICPhS XVII. pp. 1406–1409.
- Moran, Steven (2012). Phonetics Information Base and Lexicon (PDF) (PhD thesis). University of Washington. hdl:1773/22452.
