= William J. Samarin =

American linguist (1926–2020)

- Born: February 7, 1926; Los Angeles, California
- Died: January 16, 2020 (aged 93); Toronto
- Education: University of California, Berkeley (PhD 1962)
- Known for: work on glossolalia, the Sango language
- Scientific career
- Fields: Linguistics
- Workplaces: University of Toronto; Hartford Seminary
- Thesis: The Gbeya language (1962)
- Doctoral advisor: Murray B. Emeneau
- Doctoral students: Ivan Kalmar

William John Samarin (February 7, 1926 - January 16, 2020) was an American-born linguist and academic who was Professor at the Hartford Seminary and the University of Toronto. He is best known for his work on the language of religion, on the two central African languages Sango and Gbeya, on pidginization, and on ideophones in African languages.

== Education and career ==
After obtaining undergraduate degrees from the Bible Institute of Los Angeles and the University of California, Berkeley, Samarin became a missionary linguist and studied the Gbeya and Sango languages of the Ubangi-Shari region (now the Central African Republic). He received his Ph.D. in linguistics from the University of California, Berkeley, in 1962. His first appointment as a professor of linguistics was at the Hartford Seminary, which he left for the University of Toronto in 1968. In 2019, he received a Lifetime Achievement Award of the Society for Pidgin and Creole Linguistics.

== Research ==
Samarin spent almost a decade in Central Africa studying Gbeya, Sango and other African languages. He was one of the first to study ideophones in a number of different African languages, and he did extensive research on the history of the Sango language, which he claimed involved pidginization.

Another strand of his work relates to the language of religion, in particular glossolalia in charismatic Christianity. This work was partly based on participant observation, as Samarin grew up as a member of the Molokan community in Los Angeles.

Samarin was also the author of the first textbook on field research in linguistics, and the first to use the term “field linguistics” (Samarin 1967). He also authored an important early article about ideophones.

== Bibliography ==
- Samarin, William J. 1962. The Gbeya language. Berkeley: UC Berkeley Ph.D. dissertation.
- Samarin, William J. 1966. The Gbeya language: Grammar, texts, and vocabularies. Berkeley: University of California Press.
- Samarin, William J. 1967a. A grammar of Sango. Paris: Mouton.
- Samarin, William J. 1967b. Basic course in Sango. Winona Lake, Ind.: Grace College.
- Samarin, William J. 1967c. Field linguistics: A guide linguistic field work. New York, N.Y.: Holt, Rinehart & Winston.
- Samarin, William J. 1972. Tongues of men and angels: The religious language of Pentecostalism. Macmillan.
- Samarin, William J. 1978. Language in religious practice. Rowley, Ma.: Newbury House.
- Samarin, William J. 1989. The Black man’s burden: African colonial labor on the Congo and Ubangi rivers, 1880-1900. Boulder: Westview Press.
- Samarin, William J. 1998. C'est passionnant d'être passionné: A memoir of my life as a linguist. In Koerner, E.F.K. (ed.), First Person Singular III: Autobiographies by North American scholars in the language sciences. Amsterdam: Benjamins.
- Samarin, William J. 2013a. Sango. In Michaelis, Susanne Maria, Maurer, Philippe, Haspelmath, Martin & Huber, Magnus (ed.), The Survey of Pidgin and Creole Languages, Volume III, 13–24. Oxford: Oxford University Press. (Also online: APiCS Online - Survey chapter: Sango)
- Samarin, William J. 2013b. Sango structure dataset. In: APiCS Online (https://apics-online.info/contributions/59)
