= Leipzig–Jakarta list =

List of words used to test for cognates

The Leipzig–Jakarta list of 100 words is used by linguists to test the degree of chronological separation of languages by comparing words that are resistant to borrowing. The Leipzig–Jakarta list became available in 2009. The word list is named after the cities of Leipzig, Germany, and Jakarta, Indonesia, the places where the list was conceived and created.

In the 1950s, the linguist Morris Swadesh published a list of 200 words called the Swadesh list, allegedly the 200 lexical concepts found in all languages that were least likely to be borrowed from other languages. Swadesh later whittled his list down to 100 items. The Swadesh list, however, was based mainly on intuition, according to Martin Haspelmath and Uri Tadmor. In origin, the words in the Swadesh lists were chosen for their universal, culturally independent availability in as many languages as possible, regardless of their "stability". Nevertheless, the stability of the resulting list of "universal" vocabulary under language change and the potential use of this fact for purposes of glottochronology have been analyzed by numerous authors, including Marisa Lohr 1999, 2000.

The Swadesh list was put together by Morris Swadesh on the basis of his intuition. Similar more recent lists, such as the Dolgopolsky list (1964) or the Leipzig–Jakarta list, are based on systematic data from many different languages, but they are not yet as widely known nor as widely used as the Swadesh list. Although he was one of the pioneers of glottochronology and lexicostatistics, his theories were often controversial, and some have been deprecated by later linguists.

The Loanword Typology Project, with the World Loanword Database (WOLD), published by the Max Planck Digital Library, was established to rectify this problem. Experts on 41 languages from across the world were given a uniform vocabulary list and asked to provide the words for each item in the language on which they were an expert, as well as information on how strong the evidence was that each word was borrowed. The 100 concepts that were found in most languages and were most resistant to borrowing formed the Leipzig–Jakarta list. Only 62 items on the Leipzig–Jakarta list and on the 100-word Swadesh list overlap, hence a 38% difference between the two lists.

A quarter of the words in the Leipzig–Jakarta list are human body parts: mouth, eye, leg/foot, navel, liver, knee, etc. Six animal words appear on the list: fish, bird, dog, louse, ant and fly – animal species that are present wherever humans are as well.

The items house, name, rope and to tie are products of human culture, but are probably found in all present-day human societies. Haspelmath and Tadmor drew the conclusion that "rope is the most basic of human tools and tying is the most basic technology".

== List ==
Lexical items in the Leipzig–Jakarta list are ranked by semantic stability, i.e. words least likely to be replaced by other words as a language evolves. The right two columns indicate inclusion on the 100-word and 207-word Swadesh lists.

Rank	Word meaning	100-word Swadesh list	207-word Swadesh list
1	fire	✔	✔
2	nose	✔	✔
3	to go		
4	water	✔	✔
5	mouth	✔	✔
6	tongue	✔	✔
7	blood	✔	✔
8	bone	✔	✔
9	2nd-person singular pronoun (you)	✔	✔
10	root	✔	✔
11	to come	✔	✔
12	breast	✔	✔
13	rain	✔	✔
14	1st-person singular pronoun (I/me)	✔	✔
15	name	✔	✔
16	louse	✔	✔
17	wing		✔
18	flesh/meat	✔	✔
19	arm/hand	✔	✔
20	fly		✔
21	night	✔	✔
22	ear	✔	✔
23	neck	✔	✔
24	far		✔
25	to do/make		
26	house		
27	stone/rock	✔	✔
28	bitter		
29	to say	✔	✔
30	tooth	✔	✔
31	hair	✔	✔
32	big	✔	✔
33	one	✔	✔
34	who?	✔	✔
35	3rd-person singular pronoun (he/she/it/him/her)		
36	to hit/beat		✔
37	leg/foot	✔	✔
38	horn	✔	✔
39	this	✔	✔
40	fish	✔	✔
41	yesterday		
42	to drink	✔	✔
43	black	✔	✔
44	navel		
45	to stand	✔	✔
46	to bite	✔	✔
47	back		✔
48	wind		✔
49	smoke	✔	✔
50	what?	✔	✔
51	child (kin term)		✔
52	egg	✔	✔
53	to give	✔	✔
54	new	✔	✔
55	to burn (intr.)	✔	✔
56	not	✔	✔
57	good	✔	✔
58	to know	✔	✔
59	knee	✔	✔
60	sand	✔	✔
61	to laugh		✔
62	to hear	✔	✔
63	soil	✔	✔
64	leaf	✔	✔
65	red	✔	✔
66	liver	✔	✔
67	to hide		
68	skin/hide	✔	✔
69	to suck		✔
70	to carry		
71	ant		
72	heavy		✔
73	to take		
74	old		✔
75	to eat	✔	✔
76	thigh		
77	thick		✔
78	long	✔	✔
79	to blow		✔
80	wood		
81	to run		
82	to fall		✔
83	eye	✔	✔
84	ash	✔	✔
85	tail	✔	✔
86	dog	✔	✔
87	to cry/weep		
88	to tie		✔
89	to see	✔	✔
90	sweet		
91	rope		✔
92	shade/shadow		
93	bird	✔	✔
94	salt		✔
95	small	✔	✔
96	wide		✔
97	star	✔	✔
98	in		✔
99	hard		
100	to crush/grind		

== Other differences with the Swadesh list ==
Items on the 100-word Swadesh list but not on the Leipzig–Jakarta list:

- all
- bark
- belly
- cloud
- cold
- die
- dry
- feather
- fingernail
- fly (verb)
- full
- grease
- green
- head
- heart
- hot
- kill
- lie
- man
- many
- moon
- mountain
- path
- person
- round
- seed
- sit
- sleep
- sun
- swim
- that
- tree
- two
- walk
- we
- white
- woman
- yellow

== See also ==
- ASJP list
- Swadesh list
- Dolgopolsky list
- Comparative method
- Holle lists
