= Subgroup (disambiguation) =

A subgroup is an object in abstract algebra.

Subgroup may also refer to:

- a subdivision of a group
- a subgroup of a galaxy group
- a taxonomic rank between species and genus
- a unit of language classification within a language family (see also subgrouping)
- a subgroup of a group (stratigraphy)
