= CLLD =

CLLD may refer to:

- Community-led local development, a European Union initiative to support the decentralised management of development projects
- Cross-Linguistic Linked Data, a project coordinating over a dozen linguistics databases
