= David Gil =

David Gil may refer to:

- David Gil (footballer) (born 1994), Spanish footballer
- David Gil (linguist) (born 1953), British linguist
