= Samarin (surname) =

Samarin (Russian: Самарин) is a Russian masculine surname. Its feminine counterpart is Samarina. It may refer to

- Alexander Samarin (born 1998), Russian figure skater
- Ivan Samarin (racing driver) (born 1988), Russian racing driver
- Ivan Samarin (actor) (1817–1885), Russian stage actor, theatre director and playwright
- Vladimir Samarin (1913–1992), Russian Axis collaborator, journalist, writer, researcher and educator
- William J. Samarin (1926–2020), professor of linguistics at the University of Toronto
- Yelena Samarina (1933–2011), Russian-born Spanish actress
- Yuri Samarin (1819–1876), Russian Slavophile
- Ivan Samarin (1857-1948), Molokan communicator
