= Lexicostatistics =

Method of comparative linguistics

Lexicostatistics is a method of comparative linguistics that involves comparing the percentage of lexical cognates between languages to determine their relationship. Lexicostatistics is related to the comparative method but does not reconstruct a proto-language. It is to be distinguished from glottochronology, which attempts to use lexicostatistical methods to estimate the length of time since two or more languages diverged from a common earlier proto-language. This is merely one application of lexicostatistics, however; other applications of it may not share the assumption of a constant rate of change for basic lexical items.

The term "lexicostatistics" is misleading in that mathematical equations are used but not statistics. Other features of a language may be used other than the lexicon, though this is unusual. Whereas the comparative method used shared identified innovations to determine sub-groups, lexicostatistics does not identify these. Lexicostatistics is a distance-based method, whereas the comparative method considers language characters directly. The lexicostatistics method is a simple and fast technique relative to the comparative method but has limitations (discussed below). It can be validated by cross-checking the trees produced by both methods.

== History ==
Lexicostatistics was developed by Morris Swadesh in a series of articles in the 1950s, based on earlier ideas. The concept's first known use was by Dumont d'Urville in 1834 who compared various "Oceanic" languages and proposed a method for calculating a coefficient of relationship. Hymes (1960) and Embleton (1986) both review the history of lexicostatistics.

== Method ==
=== Create word list ===
The aim is to generate a list of universally used meanings (hand, mouth, sky, I). Words are then collected for these meaning slots for each language being considered. Swadesh reduced a larger set of meanings down to 200 originally. He later found that it was necessary to reduce it further but that he could include some meanings that were not in his original list, giving his later 100-item list. The Swadesh list in Wiktionary gives the total 207 meanings in a number of languages. Alternative lists that apply more rigorous criteria have been generated, e.g. the Dolgopolsky list and the Leipzig–Jakarta list, as well as lists with a more specific scope; for example, Dyen, Kruskal and Black have 200 meanings for 84 Indo-European languages in digital form.

=== Determine cognacies ===
A trained and experienced linguist is needed to make cognacy decisions. However, the decisions may need to be refined as the state of knowledge increases. However, lexicostatistics does not rely on all the decisions being correct. For each pair of words (in different languages) in this list, the cognacy of a form could be positive, negative or indeterminate. Sometimes a language has multiple words for one meaning, e.g. small and little for not big.

=== Calculate lexicostatistic percentages ===
This percentage is related to the proportion of meanings for a particular language pair that are cognate, i.e. relative to the total without indeterminacy. This value is entered into an N×N table of distances, where N is the number of languages being compared. When completed, this table is half-filled in triangular form. The higher the proportion of cognacy the closer the languages are related.

=== Create family tree ===
Creation of the language tree is based solely on the table found above. Various sub-grouping methods can be used but that adopted by Dyen, Kruskal and Black was:

- all lists are placed in a pool
- the two closest members are removed and form a nucleus which is placed in the pool
- this step is repeated
- under certain conditions a nucleus becomes a group
- this is repeated until the pool only contains one group.

Calculations have to be of nucleus and group lexical percentages.

== Applications ==
A leading exponent of lexicostatistics application has been Isidore Dyen. He used lexicostatistics to classify Austronesian languages as well as Indo-European ones. A major study of the latter was reported by Dyen, Kruskal and Black (1992). Studies have also been carried out on Amerindian and African languages.

=== Pama-Nyungan ===
The problem of internal branching within the Pama-Nyungan language family has been a long-standing issue for Australianist linguistics, and general consensus held that internal connections between the 25+ different subgroups of Pama-Nyungan were either impossible to reconstruct or that the subgroups were not in fact genetically related at all. In 2012, Claire Bowern and Quentin Atkinson published the results from their application of computational phylogenetic methods on 194 doculects representing all major subgroups and isolates of Pama-Nyungan. Their model "recovered" many of the branches and divisions that had erstwhile been proposed and accepted by many other Australianists, while also providing some insight into the more problematic branches, such as Paman (which is complicated by the lack of data) and Ngumpin-Yapa (where the genetic picture is obscured by very high rates of borrowing between languages). Their dataset forms the largest of its kind for a hunter-gatherer language family, and the second largest overall after Austronesian (Greenhill et al. 2008). They conclude that Pama-Nyungan languages are in fact not exceptional to lexicostatistical methods, which have successfully been applied to other language families of the world.

== Criticisms ==
People such as Hoijer (1956) have shown that there were difficulties in finding equivalents to the meaning items while many have found it necessary to modify Swadesh's lists. Gudschinsky (1956) questioned whether it was possible to obtain a universal list.

Factors such as borrowing, tradition and taboo can skew the results, as with other methods. Sometimes lexicostatistics has been used with lexical similarity being used rather than cognacy to find resemblances. This is then equivalent to mass comparison.

The choice of meaning slots is subjective, as is the choice of synonyms.

== Improved methods ==
Some of the modern computational statistical hypothesis testing methods can be regarded as improvements of lexicostatistics in that they use similar word lists and distance measures.

== See also ==
- Basic English
- Cognate
- Comparative linguistics
- Comparative method
- Global Lexicostatistical Database
- Glottochronology
- Historical linguistics
- Indo-European studies
- Intercontinental Dictionary Series
- Linguistic distance
- Mass lexical comparison
- Proto-language
- Swadesh list
- Word list
