= Russell Gray =

New Zealand linguist and evolutionary biologist

- Born: Russell David Gray
- Occupation: Scientist

Academic background
- Thesis: Design, constraint and construction: Essays and experiments on evolution and foraging (1990)
- Doctoral advisor: John Craig and Michael Davison

Academic work
- Institutions: University of Auckland, Max Planck Institute for the Science of Human History, Max Planck Institute for Evolutionary Anthropology
- Doctoral students: Simon Greenhill
- Main interests: Evolution, computational phylogenetics

Russell David Gray is a New Zealand evolutionary Biologist and Psychologist working on applying quantitative methods to the study of cultural evolution and human prehistory. He is a Director at the Max Planck Institute for Evolutionary Anthropology in Leipzig, where he heads the Department of Linguistic and Cultural Evolution, and holds an adjunct position in the School of Psychology at the University of Auckland. He is known for the application of computational phylogenetic methods to the study of language families including Indo-European and Austronesian, and for research on tool manufacture in New Caledonian crows.

== Career ==
Gray completed his Ph.D. at the University of Auckland in 1990. He spent four years lecturing at the University of Otago, New Zealand, before returning to the School of Psychology at the University of Auckland. He is a Fellow of the Royal Society of New Zealand and has been awarded with several fellowships, as well as the inaugural Mason Durie Medal (in 2012) for his pioneering contributions to social science. In 2014, he became one of the two founding directors of the Max Planck Institute for the Science of Human History in Jena, Germany, where he established and headed the Department of Linguistic and Cultural Evolution. In 2020 the department relocated to the Max Planck Institute for Evolutionary Anthropology in Leipzig, where Gray was appointed a Director. He also holds adjunct positions in the School of Psychology at the University of Auckland and the Department of Philosophy at the Australian National University.

Gray's doctoral thesis was titled Design, constraint and construction: essays and experiments on evolution and foraging.

Notable students of Gray include Simon Greenhill.

== Evolutionary linguistics and cultural evolution ==
Gray was among the researchers who applied phylogenetic methods developed in evolutionary biology to problems in historical linguistics. In 2000, with Fiona Jordan, he used language trees to test competing models of the Austronesian expansion into the Pacific. In 2003, with his doctoral student Quentin Atkinson, he applied Bayesian phylogenetic dating to the disputed question of Indo-European origins, reporting divergence dates consistent with an Anatolian farming expansion. The study was widely discussed and contested, both on the question of Indo-European origins and on the use of phylogenetic methods in linguistics.

With Alexei Drummond and Simon Greenhill, Gray used a database of Austronesian basic vocabulary to reconstruct the settlement of the Pacific, describing a sequence of expansion pulses and pauses. A 2011 study of which he was a co-author compared word-order features across four language families and reported lineage-specific rather than universal patterns of change.

Gray is project leader of Grambank, a database of grammatical features compiled for comparative analysis, and a member of the team behind Lexibank, a collection of standardised lexical datasets. The initial global analysis of Grambank reported strong genealogical structuring of grammatical diversity and assessed the loss of structural diversity associated with language endangerment.

A 2023 study co-authored by Gray combined an expanded Indo-European lexical dataset with ancient DNA evidence to argue for an origin south of the Caucasus, with subsequent spread of some branches through the Pontic–Caspian steppe.

== Animal cognition ==
Gray has conducted research on tool manufacture and use in New Caledonian crows. Working with Gavin Hunt at the University of Auckland, he studied the form, geographical distribution and development of the birds' tool-making. A 2001 study with Hunt and Michael Corballis reported population-level laterality in tool manufacture. Later work considered whether variation in tool design reflects cultural transmission and cumulative modification.

Experimental work by the Auckland group examined the cognitive mechanisms involved, including metatool use, causal reasoning and planning. A 2007 experiment reported that the crows could spontaneously use one tool to obtain another. Subsequent experiments tested whether their performance reflected causal understanding or simpler associative learning.

== Honours ==
Gray was elected a Fellow of the Royal Society of New Zealand in 2008. In 2002 he was awarded a James Cook Research Fellowship, and in 2012 he received the inaugural Mason Durie Medal, awarded for advances at the frontiers of social science; in its citation the Society credited him with pioneering the systematic application of evolutionary thinking and computational methods to questions of language, cognition and culture.
