= Lexibank =

Linguistics database

- Producer: Max Planck Institute for Evolutionary Anthropology (Germany)
- Languages: English

Access
- Cost: Free

Coverage
- Disciplines: Linguistics, lexicography

Links
- Website: lexibank.clld.org

Lexibank is a linguistics database managed by the Max Planck Institute for Evolutionary Anthropology in Leipzig, Germany. The database consists of over 100 standardized wordlists (datasets) that are independently curated.

== Description ==
Lexibank datasets are presented in the Cross-Linguistic Data Format (CLDF).

Phonological and lexical features are automatically computed in Lexibank.

The datasets are publicly accessible and are archived at Zenodo and are also publicly available on GitHub. Lexibank is also part of the Cross-Linguistic Linked Data project. All of the datasets are released under the CC BY 4.0 license.

Applications of the database include historical linguistics and comparative phonology.

== List of datasets ==
The following is a list of Lexibank (version 0.2) datasets as of 17 June 2022.

ID	Languages	Zenodo	Citation
aaleykusunda	Kusunda	5115947	Uday Raj Aaley and Timotheus A. Bodt (2020): New Kusunda data: A list of 250 concepts. Computer-Assisted Language Comparison in Practice 3.4 (08/04/2020), URL: https://calc.hypotheses.org/2414.
abrahammonpa	Monpa	5115885	Abraham, Binny, Kara Sako, Elina Kinny, and Isapdaile Zeliang (2018): Sociolinguistic Research among Selected Groups in Western Arunachal Pradesh: Highlighting Monpa. Dallas: SIL International.
allenbai	Bai	5115649	Allen, Bryan (2007): Bai Dialect Survey. Dallas: SIL International.
backstromnorthernpakistan	Northern Pakistan	5116054	Backstrom, Peter C. and Radloff, Carla F. (1992): Sociolinguistic Survey of Northern Pakistan, Volume 2. Languages of Northern Areas. Islamabad: National Institute of Pakistan Studies.
bantubvd	Bantu	5115982	Simon Greenhill and Russell Gray, 2015. Bantu Basic Vocabulary Database.
bdpa		5116087	List, Johann-Mattis and Jelena Prokić. (2014). A benchmark database of phonetic alignments in historical linguistics and dialectology. In: Proceedings of the International Conference on Language Resources and Evaluation (LREC), 26 — 31 May 2014, Reykjavik. 288-294.
beidasinitic	Sinitic	5119295	Běijīng Dàxué 北京大学 (1964): Hànyǔ fāngyán cíhuì 汉语方言词汇 [Chinese dialect vocabularies]. Beijing: Wenzi Gaige.
birchallchapacuran	Chapacuran	5119306	Birchall J, Dunn M, & Greenhill SJ. 2016. A Combined Comparative and Phylogenetic Analysis of the Chapacuran Language Family. International Journal of American Linguistics 82(3). 255–284.
blustaustronesian	Austronesian	5137392	Greenhill, SJ; Blust, R and Gray, RD (2008): The Austronesian Basic Vocabulary Database: From bioinformatics to lexomics. Evolutionary Bioinformatics. 4. 271-283.
bodtkhobwa	Kho-Bwa	5119330	Bodt, Timotheus Adrianus and List, Johann-Mattis (2019): Testing the predictive strength of the comparative method: An ongoing experiment on unattested words in Western Kho-Bwa languages. Papers in Historical Phonology 4.1: 22-44.
bowernpny	Pama-Nyungan	5119341	Bowern, Claire, & Atkinson, Quentin. (2012). Computational Phylogenetics and the Internal Structure of Pama-Nyungan: Dataset [Data set]. Language. doi:10.1353/lan.2012.0081
cals	Turkic and Indo-European	5121189	Mennecier, P., Nerbonne, J., Heyer, E., & Manni, F. (2016). A Central Asian Language Survey, Language Dynamics and Change, 6(1), 57-98. doi:10.1163/22105832-00601015
carvalhopurus	Purus	5121195	de Carvalho, F. O. (2021): A comparative reconstruction of Proto-Purus (Arawakan) segmental phonology. IJAL. 87.1. 49-108.
castrosui	Sui	5121213	Castro, Andy and Pan, Xingwen (2015): Sui dialect research. SIL: Guiyang.
castroyi	Yi	5121214	Castro, Andy; Crook, Brian; Flaming, Royce (2010): A sociolinguistic survey of Kua-nsi and related Yi varieties in Heqing county, Yunnan province, China. SIL Electronic Survey Reports 2010-001. Dallas: SIL International.
castrozhuang	Zhuang	5121215	Castro, Andy; Hansen, Bruce (2010): Hongshui He Zhuang dialect intelligibility survey. Dallas: SIL International.
chaconarawakan	Arawakan	5118556	Chacon, Thiago C. (2017): Arawakan and Tukanoan contacts in Northwest Amazonia prehistory. PAPIA 27(2). 237-265.
chaconbaniwa	Baniwa	5118605	Chacon, T. C.; Gonçalves, A. G.; and da Silva, L. F (2019): A diversidade linguística Aruák no Alto Rio Negro em gravações da década de 1950 [The diversity of Arawakan languages from the upper Rio Negro in recordings from the 1950s]. Forma y Función, 32.2, 41-67. doi:10.15446/fyf.v32n2.80814
chaconcolumbian	Colombian	5118763	Chacon, Thiago C. (2017): Arawakan and Tukanoan contacts in Northwest Amazonia prehistory. PAPIA 27(2). 237-265.
chacontukanoan	Tukanoan	5118723	T. Chacon. (2014). A revised proposal of Proto-Tukanoan consonants and Tukanoan family classification. Journal of American Linguistics 80.3, pp. 275–322. doi:10.1086/676393
chenhmongmien	Hmong-Mien	5118744	Chén, Qíguāng 陳其光 (2012): Miáoyáo yǔwén 苗瑤语文 [Miao and Yao language]. Zhōngyāng Mínzú Dàxué 中央民族大学 [China Minzu University Press].
chindialectsurvey	Chin	5121280	Language and Social Development Organization (2019): Chin dialect data collection. Yangon: LSDO.
chingelong	Gelong	5121324	Chin, Andy C. (2015): The Gelong Language in the Multilingual Hub of Hainan. Bulletin of Chinese Linguistics. 8. 140-156.
clarkkimmun	Kim Mun	5121482	Clark, E. R. (2008). A phonological analysis and comparison of two Kim Mun varieties in Laos and Vietnam. Payap University: Chiang Mai.
clics1		5121530	List, Johann-Mattis, Thomas Mayer, Anselm Terhalle, and Matthias Urban (2014). CLICS: Database of Cross-Linguistic Colexifications. Marburg: Forschungszentrum Deutscher Sprachatlas (Version 1.0).
constenlachibchan	Chibchan	5121347	Umaña, Adolfo Constenla. 2005. ¿Existe relación genealógica entre las lenguas misumalpas y las chibchenses?. Estudios de Lingüística Chibcha.
davletshinaztecan	Aztecan	5121382	Davletshin, Albert (2012): Proto-Uto-Aztecans on their way to the Proto-Aztecan homeland: linguistic evidence. Journal of Language Relationship. 8. 1. 75-92.
deepadungpalaung	Palaung	5121402	Deepadung, Sujaritlak; Buakaw, Supakit; and Rattanapitak, Ampica (2015): A lexical comparison of the Palaung dialects spoken in China, Myanmar, and Thailand. Mon-Khmer Studies 44. 19-38.
diacl		5121561	Carling, Gerd (ed.) 2017. Diachronic Atlas of Comparative Linguistics Online. Lund: Lund University. (URL: https://diacl.ht.lu.se/). Accessed on: 2019-02-07.
dravlex	Dravidian	5121580	Kolipakam, Vishnupriya, Michael Dunn, Fiona M. Jordan & Annemarie Verkerk. (2018). DravLex: A Dravidian lexical database. Max Planck Institute for Psycholinguistics, Nijmegen, The Netherlands.
dunnaslian	Aslian	5121613	Dunn, Michael, Nicole Kruspe, and Niclas Burenhult. 2013. "Time and Place in the Prehistory of the Aslian Languages." Human Biology 85: 383–400.
dunnielex	Indo-European	5121651	Dunn, Michael (2012): Indo-European Lexical Cognacy Database. Max Planck Institute for Psycholinguistics: Nijmegen.
duonglachi	Lachi	5121663	Duong, Thu Hang and Nguyen, Thu Quynh and Nguyen, Van Loi (2021): The Language of the La Chí People in Bản Díu Commune, Xín Mần District, Hà Giang Province, Vietnam. In: Studies in the Anthropology of Language in Mainland Southeast Asia. Ed. by N. J. Enfield, Jack Sidnell, and Charles H. P. Zuckermann. University of Hawaii Press: Honolulu. 124-138
felekesemitic	Semitic	5126691	Feleke, Tekabe Legesse (2021): Ethiosemitic languages: classifications and classification determinants. Ampersand. 2021. doi:10.1016/j.amper.2021.100074
galuciotupi	Tupian	5121724	Galucio, Ana Vilacy, Meira, Sérgio, Birchall, Joshua, Moore, Denny, Gabas Júnior, Nilson, Drude, Sebastian, Storto, Luciana, Picanço, Gessiane, & Rodrigues, Carmen Reis. (2015). Genealogical relations and lexical distances within the Tupian linguistic family. Boletim do Museu Paraense Emílio Goeldi. Ciências Humanas, 10(2), 229-274. doi:10.1590/1981-81222015000200004
gaotb	Tibeto-Burman	5121776	Gao, Tianjun (2020): Reconstruction and analysis of phylogenetic network on Tibeto-Burman languages in China. Journal of Chinese Linguistics, 48:1, 257-293.
gerarditupi	Tupi–Guarani	5127906	Ferraz Gerardi, Fabrício and Reichert, Stanislav (2020) The Tupí-Guaraní Language Family: A Phylogenetic Classification. To appear in Diachronica.
halenepal	Nepal	5121540	Hale, Austin (1973): Clause, sentences, and discourse patterns in selected languages of Nepal. Kathmandu: Institute of Nepal and Asiatic Studies.
hantganbangime	Bangime	5126441	Hantgan, Abbie and List, Johann-Mattis (2018): Bangime. Secret language, language isolate, or language island? Journal of Language Contact.
hattorijaponic	Japonic	5126845	Hattori, S. (1973): Japanese dialects. In: Diachronic, areal and typological linguistics. Edited by H. M. Hoenigswald and R. H. Langacre. 368-400.
houchinese	Sinitic	5126858	Hóu, J. (2004): Xiàndài Hànyǔ fāngyán yīnkù 现代汉语方言音库 [Phonological database of Chinese dialects]. Shànghǎi: Shànghǎi Jiàoyù.
hsiuhmongmien	Hmong-Mien	5126451	Hsiu, Andrew (2015): The classification of Na Meo, a Hmong-Mien language of Vietnam. Handout prepared for SEALS 25 (Chiang Mai, 2015/05/27-29).
hubercolumbian	Colombian	5121219	Huber, R. Q. and Reed, R. B. 1992. Vocabulario comparativo: palabras selectas de lenguas indígenas de Colombia [Comparative vocabulary. Selected words from the indigenous languages of Columbia]. Santafé de Bogota: Associatión Instituto Lingüístico de Verano.
huntergatherer		5126741	Bowern, Claire, Patience Epps, Jane Hill, and Patrick McConvell. Hunter-Gatherer Language Database. https://huntergatherer.la.utexas.edu/ Accessed 2021-04-27.
ids		5126899	Key, Mary Ritchie & Comrie, Bernard (eds.) 2015. The Intercontinental Dictionary Series. Leipzig: Max Planck Institute for Evolutionary Anthropology.
ivanisuansu	Suansu	5126966	Ivani, J. K. (2019): A first overview on Suansu, a Tibeto-Burman language from Northeastern India. Talk, held at the 29th conference of the Southeast Asian Linguistic Society (27-29 May, Tokyo). https://zenodo.org/record/3383006
johanssonsoundsymbolic		5127131	Erben Johansson, N., Anikin, A., Carling, G., & Holmer, A. (2020). The typology of sound symbolism: Defining macro-concepts via their semantic and phonetic features, Linguistic Typology, 24(2), 253-310. doi:10.1515/lingty-2020-2034
joophonosemantic		5137230	Joo, I. (2020). Phonosemantic biases found in Leipzig-Jakarta lists of 66 languages. Linguistic Typology, 24(1), 1–12. doi:10.1515/lingty-2019-0030
kesslersignificance		5127775	Kessler, B. (2001): The Significance of Wordlists. CSLI: Stanford.
kleinewillinghoeferbikwinjen	Bikwin-Jen	5127404	Kleinewillinghöfer, Ulrich (2015). Bikwin-Jen Group. https://www.blogs.uni-mainz.de/fb07-adamawa/adamawa-languages/bikwin-jen-group/. Accessed on: 2020-04-15.
kraftchadic	Chadic	5121222	Kraft, Charles H. 1981. Chadic wordlists. Berlin: Dietrich Reimer.
leejaponic	Japonic	5126801	Lee, Sean, Hasegawa, Toshikazu (2011). Bayesian phylogenetic analysis supports an agricultural origin of Japonic languages. Proceedings of the Royal Society B: Biological Sciences, 278(1725), 3662–3669. doi:10.1098/rspb.2011.0518
leeainu	Ainu	5126890	Lee Sean, Hasegawa Toshikazu (2013). Evolution of the Ainu Language in Space and Time. PLoS ONE 8(4): e62243. doi:10.1371/journal.pone.0062243
bremerberta	Berta	5126757	Bremer, Nate D. (2016): A Sociolinguistic Survey of Six Berta Speech Varieties in Ethiopia. SIL Electronic Survey Reports 2016-007. Dallas: SIL International.
leekoreanic	Koreanic	5126904	Lee, Sean (2015). A Sketch of Language History in the Korean Peninsula. PLoS ONE 10(5): e0128448. doi:10.1371/journal.pone.0128448
lieberherrkhobwa	Kho-Bwa	5127687	Lieberherr, Ismail and Bodt, Timotheus Adrianus (2017): Sub-grouping Kho-Bwa based on shared core vocabulary. Himalayan Linguistics 16(2). 26-63. URL: https://escholarship.org/uc/item/4t27h5fg
lindseyende	Ende	5127829	Kate Lynn Lindsey and Bernard Comrie. 2020. Ende (Papua New Guinea) dictionary. In: Key, Mary Ritchie & Comrie, Bernard (eds.) The Intercontinental Dictionary Series. Leipzig: Max Planck Institute for Evolutionary Anthropology. (Available online at http://ids.clld.org/)
listsamplesize		5128050	List, Johann-Mattis (2014): Investigating the impact of sample size on cognate detection. Journal of Language Relationship. 11. 91-102. doi:10.31826/jlr-2014-110111
liusinitic	Sinitic	5131413	Líu, L.; Wáng, H.; Bǎi, Y. (2007): Xiàndài Hànyǔ fāngyán héxīncí, tèzhēng cíjí 现代汉语方言核心词·特征词集 [Collection of basic vocabulary words and characteristic dialect words in modern Chinese dialects]. Nánjīng: Fènghuáng.
lundgrenomagoa	Proto-Omagua-Kokama-Tupinambá	5128097	Lundgren, Olof (2020): A phonological reconstruction of Proto-Omagua-Kokama-Tupinambá. Master's thesis. Lund: Lund University.
mannburmish	Burmish	5131419	Mann, Noel W. 1998. A phonological reconstruction of Proto Northern Burmic. (PhD Thesis).
marrisonnaga	Naga	5121317	Marrison, Geoffrey Edward (1967) : The classification of the Naga languages of North-East India. London: School of African and Oriental Sciences.
mcelhanonhuon	Huon	5127348	McElhanon, K.A. 1967. Preliminary Observations on Huon Peninsula Languages. Oceanic Linguistics. 6, 1-45.
mitterhoferbena	Bena	5121327	Mitterhofer, Bernadette. 2013. Lessons from a dialect survey of Bena: Analyzing wordlists. SIL International.
naganorgyalrongic	rGyalrongic	5126458	Nagano, Yasuhiko and Prins, Marielle (2013): rGyalrongic Languages Database. Osaka: National Museum of Ethnology.
nagarajakhasian	Khasian	5131421	Nagaraja KS, Sidwell P & Greenhill SJ. 2013. A Lexicostatistical Study of the Khasian Languages: Khasi, Pnar, Lyngngam, and War. Mon-Khmer Studies, 42, 1-11.
northeuralex		5121268	Dellert, J., Daneyko, T., Münch, A. et al (2020). NorthEuraLex (Version 0.9). Lang Resources and Evaluation. doi:10.1007/s10579-019-09480-6
peirosaustroasiatic	Austroasiatic	5127536	Peiros, I. I. (2004): Генетическая классификация австроазиатских языков / Genetičeskaja klassifikacija avstroaziatskix jazykov [Genetic classification of Austro-Asiatic languages]. Russian State University for the Humanities, Russian State University for the Humanities, Moscow.
pharaocoracholaztecan	Proto-Corachol, Proto-Náhuatl	5136882	Pharao Hansen, Magnus (2020): ¿Familia o vecinos? Investigando la relación entre el proto-náhuatl y el proto-corachol [Family or neighbors? Investigating the relation between Proto-Náhuatl and Proto-Corachol]. In: Lenguas yutoaztecas: historia, estructuras y contacto lingüístico. Homenaje a Karen Dakin. Rosa Yañez (ed.) Guadalajara: Universidad de Guadalajara.
polyglottaafricana		5136890	Koelle, Sigismund W. (1854). Polyglotta Africana or Comparative Vocabulary of Nearly Three Hundred Words and Phrases in more than One Hundred Distinct African Languages. London: Church Missionary House.
ratcliffearabic	Arabic	5136898	Ratcliffe, Robert R. (2021): The glottometrics of Arabic. Language Dynamics and Change. 2021. doi:10.1163/22105832-01001100
robinsonap	Alor-Pantar	5121340	Robinson, Laura C. and Holton, Gary (2012): Internal Classification of the Alor-Pantar Language Family Using Computational Methods Applied to the Lexicon. Language Dynamics and Change 2.2. 123-149.
saenkoromance	Romance	5136900	Saenko, M. (2015): Annotated Swadesh wordlists for the Romance group (Indo-European family). In: Starostin GS, editor. The Global Lexicostatistical Database. RGU; 2015. http://starling.rinet.ru/new100/tuj.xls
sagartst	Sino-Tibetan	5121409	Laurent Sagart, Jacques, Guillaume, Yunfan Lai, and Johann-Mattis List (2019): Sino-Tibetan Database of Lexical Cognates. Jena: Max Planck Institute for the Science of Human History.
satterthwaitetb	Tibeto-Burman	5136997	Satterthwaite-Phillips, Damian (2011) Phylogenetic inference of the Tibeto-Burman languages or on the usefuseful of lexicostatistics (and "megalo"-comparison) for the subgrouping of Tibeto-Burman. Stanford: Stanford University.
savelyevturkic	Turkic	5137274	Savelyev, Alexander and Robbeets, Martine (2020): Bayesian phylolinguistics infers the internal structure and the time-depth of the Turkic language family. Journal of Language Evolution 5.1. 39-53.
servamalagasy	Malagasy	5137040	Serva M., Pasquini M. (2020): Dialects of Madagascar, PLoS ONE 15(10).
sidwellbahnaric	Bahnaric	5137055	Sidwell, Paul. 2015. Austroasiatic dataset for phylogenetic analysis: 2015 version. Mon-Khmer Studies (Notes, Reviews, Data-Papers) 44. lxviii-ccclvii.
simsrma	Rma	5166593	Sims, Nathanial A. (2020): Reconsidering the diachrony of tone in Rma. Journal of the Southeast Asian Linguistics Society 13.1. 53-85.
sohartmannchin	Chin	5121813	So-Hartmann, Helga (1988): Notes on the Southern Chin Languages. Linguistics of the Tibeto-Burman Area 11.2: 98-119.
starostinpie	Proto-Indo-European	5137281	Starostin, S. A. (2005): Indo-European files in DBF/VAR. Moscow.
suntb	Tibeto-Burman	5121515	Sūn, Hóngkāi 孙宏开 (1991): Zangmianyu yuyin he cihui 藏缅语音和词汇 [Tibeto-Burman phonology and lexicon]. Beijing: Chinese Social Sciences Press.
syrjaenenuralic	Uralic	5137236	Syrjänen, K.; Honkola, T.; Korhonen, K.; Lehtinen, J.; Vesakoski, O. & Wahlber, N. Shedding more light on language classification using basic vocabularies and phylogenetic methods. Diachronica, 2013, 30, 323-352
tls	Bantu	5121819	Nurse, Derek and Gérard Philippson (1975). The Tanzanian Language Survey. Department of Foreign Languages and Linguistics of the University of Dar es Salaam: Dar es Salaam.
tppsr			
transnewguineaorg	Trans-New Guinea	5141620	Greenhill, Simon J. (2015): TransNewGuinea.org: An Online Database of New Guinea Languages. PLoS ONE 10.10: e0141563.
tuled	Tupian		Ferraz Gerardi, Fabrício & Reichert, Stanislav & Aragon, Carolina. (2021) TuLeD (Tupían Lexical Database): Introducing a database of a South American language family. Language Resources and Evaluation. doi:10.1007/s10579-020-09521-5
visserkalamang	Kalamang	5139559	Eline Visser. 2021. Kalamang dictionary. In: Key, Mary Ritchie & Comrie, Bernard (eds.) The Intercontinental Dictionary Series. Leipzig: Max Planck Institute for Evolutionary Anthropology. (Available online at https://ids.clld.org/)
walworthpolynesian	Polynesian	5126932	Walworth, Mary. (2018). Polynesian Segmented Data (Version 1) [Data set]. Zenodo. doi:10.5281/zenodo.1689909
wangbai	Bai	5137407	Wang, Feng (2004): Language contact and language comparison. The case of Bai. PhD thesis. Hong Kong: City University of Hong Kong.
wangbcd	Sinitic	5136930	Wang, F. 2004. BCD: basic words of Chinese dialects. Unpublished dataset. [Digital version in: List, J.-M. (2015): Network perspectives on Chinese dialect history. Bulletin of Chinese Linguistics 8. 42-67.]
wichmannmixezoquean	Mixe-Zoquean	5126948	Cysouw, M., Wichmann, S., & Kamholz, D. (2006). A critique of the separation base method for genealogical subgrouping, with data from Mixe-Zoquean. Journal of Quantitative Linguistics, 13(2-3), 225–264. doi:10.1080/09296170600850759
wold		5139859	Haspelmath, Martin & Tadmor, Uri (eds.) 2009. World Loanword Database. Leipzig: Max Planck Institute for Evolutionary Anthropology. (Available online at https://wold.clld.org/)
yanglalo	Lalo	5121829	Yang, Cathryn (2011): Lalo regional varieties: Phylogeny, dialectometry and sociolinguistics. Bundoora: La Trobe University.
yangyi	Yi	5167277	Yang, Cathryn (2021): The phonetic tone change *high > rising: Evidence from the Ngwi dialect laboratory.
yuchinese	Sinitic	5139881	Hsiao-jung Yu and Yifan Wang. 2021. Mandarin Chinese dictionary. In: Key, Mary Ritchie & Comrie, Bernard (eds.) The Intercontinental Dictionary Series. Leipzig: Max Planck Institute for Evolutionary Anthropology. (Available online at https://ids.clld.org/)
zgraggenmadang	Madang	5121535	Z'graggen, J A. (1980) A comparative word list of the Northern Adelbert Range Languages, Madang Province, Papua New Guinea. Canberra: Pacific Linguistics.
zhaobai	Bai	5136947	Zhao, Yanzhen (2006): Zhàozhuāng Báiyǔ miáoxiě yánjiū 趙莊白語描寫研究 [Investigations of Zhaozhuang Bai]. Běijīng: Zhōngyāng Mínzú Dàxué.
zhivlovobugrian	Ob-Ugrian	5137439	Zhivlov, M. (2011): Annotated Swadesh wordlists for the Ob-Ugrian group (Uralic family). The Global Lexicostatistical Database. Moscow: RGGU.
zhoubizic	Bizic	5140129	Zhou, Yulou (2020): Proto-Bizic. A study of Tujia historical phonology. Bachelor Thesis. Stanford University.
logos		5141379	List, Johann-Mattis, Thomas Mayer, Anselm Terhalle, and Matthias Urban (2014). CLICS: Database of Cross-Linguistic Colexifications. Marburg: Forschungszentrum Deutscher Sprachatlas (Version 1.0).
utoaztecan	Uto-Aztecan	5173799	Greenhill, Simon J., Hannah J. Haynie, Robert M. Ross, Angela M. Chira, List, Johann-Mattis, Lyle Campbell, Carlos A. Botero, and Russell D. Gray (2021): A recent northern origin for the Uto-Aztecan language family. Leipzig: Max Planck Institute for Evolutionary Anthropology.
abvdoceanic	Oceanic	5206553	Greenhill, S.J., Blust. R, & Gray, R.D. (2008). The Austronesian Basic Vocabulary Database: From Bioinformatics to Lexomics. Evolutionary Bioinformatics, 4:271-283.

== Bibliography ==
- Erben Johansson, Niklas; Anikin, Andrey; Carling, Gerd; Holmer, Arthur (2020-08-27). "The typology of sound symbolism: Defining macro-concepts via their semantic and phonetic features". Linguistic Typology. 24 (2): 253–310. doi:10.1515/lingty-2020-2034. ISSN 1430-0532. (Supplementary material)
