= Isidore Dyen =

American linguist (1913–2008)

- Dyen in January 1993
- Born: August 16, 1913; Philadelphia, Pennsylvania, U.S.
- Died: December 14, 2008 (aged 95); Newton, Massachusetts, U.S.

Academic background
- Education: University of Pennsylvania
- Thesis: The Sanskrit Indeclinables of the Hindu Grammarians and Lexicographers (1939)

Isidore Dyen (August 16, 1913 – December 14, 2008) was an American linguist and professor of Malayo-Polynesian and Comparative Linguistics at Yale University. He was one of the foremost scholars in the field of Austronesian linguistics, publishing extensively on the reconstruction of Proto-Austronesian phonology and on subgrouping within the language family, the latter principally by means of lexicostatistics.

== Biography ==
The youngest son of a rabbi and his wife who had immigrated from Kiev (present-day Ukraine), Isidore Dyen was born in Philadelphia and grew up speaking Yiddish at home. He studied Hebrew at Gratz College in preparation for rabbinical training. However, during the course of earning a B.A. in 1933, an M.A. in 1934, and a Ph.D. in 1939 at the University of Pennsylvania, his interests shifted to comparative linguistics. After completing a dissertation on "The Sanskrit indeclinables of the Hindu grammarians and lexicographers" he planned to specialize in Slavic languages, but the needs of the U.S. Army during World War II drew him into languages in the Pacific Theater of Operations.

He learned Malay well enough to teach it to troops headed for the Southwest Pacific and to produce a two-volume pedagogical text, Spoken Malay (1943). After the war, he did fieldwork on two more genetically and typologically disparate Austronesian languages, Chuukese (rendered as "Trukese" at that time) and Yapese, as a member of the Tri-Institutional Coordinated Investigation of Micronesian Anthropology sponsored by Yale University, the University of Hawaiʻi, and the Bernice P. Bishop Museum. Out of this came his A Sketch of Trukese grammar (1965).

At the same time, he began applying the comparative method to revise and elaborate phonological reconstructions that had earlier been published by Otto Dempwolff (1934–38). A series of articles such as "The Malayo-Polynesian word for 'two'" (1947), "The Tagalog reflexes of Malayo-Polynesian D" (1947), "Proto-Malayo-Polynesian *Z" (1951), and "Dempwolff's *R" (1953), eventually culminated in a monograph, The Proto-Malayo-Polynesian laryngeals (1953). His application of the same methods to his own new data from Chuukese led to a monograph On the history of the Trukese vowels (1949), which brilliantly demonstrated how the nine vowels of Chuukese had derived quite regularly from the four-vowel system Dempwolff had reconstructed for Proto-Austronesian.

Dyen died of cancer on December 14, 2008 in Newton, Massachusetts.

== Selected works ==
- Dyen, Isidore; Kruskal, Joseph B; Black, Paul (1992), An Indoeuropean Classification: A Lexicostatistical Experiment, American Philosophical Society, ISBN 978-0-87169-825-4
