= John A. Holm =

American linguist

John Alexander Holm (May 16, 1943 – December 28, 2015) was an American academic. He was the chair of English Linguistics and History of Civilizations at the University of Coimbra, Portugal.

Holm was born on 16 May 1943 in Jackson, Michigan, and graduated from Jackson High School in 1961. He received a Ph.D. in linguistics from the University of London in 1978 with his thesis "The creole English of Nicaragua's Miskito Coast : its sociolinguistic history and a comparative study of its lexicon and syntax."

He was a specialist on the history and languages of the Caribbean peoples, and the author of many books and articles on those subjects. He was editor with Susanne Maria Michaelis of the series Contact languages : critical concepts in language studies. Thanks to the study of creoles, he showed that, because of its importance in Barbados, the white population is the starting point of most of the English creoles that are spoken by the Indian, white and black peoples in most parts of the Caribbean and Carolina. Holm also co-wrote the only dictionary of Bahamian English with Alison Shilling.

In 1981, Holm was teaching at Hunter College in New York City and editing the book "Western Caribbean Creole English Texts".

He died on December 28, 2015, in Azeitão, Portugal from prostate cancer. He was survived by his husband and a brother.

== Books ==
- Dictionary of Bahamian English, (with Alison Watt Shilling). Lexik House Publishers, Cold Spring, N.Y. 1982. ISBN 978-0-936368-03-0
- Central American English, (ed.) Heidelberg : J. Groos, 1983.
  - Review, by Steve Jones, Language in Society, Jun., 1984, vol. 13, no. 2, p. 281
  - Review, by J. L. Dillard, Language, Jun., 1985, vol. 61, no. 2, p. 487-489
  - Review, by G. G. Gilbert, American Speech Autumn, 1985, vol. 60, no. 3, p. 261-269
- Pidgins and Creoles 2 vol.: v.1, " Theory and structure"; v.2, "References survey" Cambridge University Press, 1988-89
  - Review, Morris Goodman, in Journal of Pidgin and Creole Language, vol. 7, no. 2 (1992); p. 352-361.)
  - Review, by Salikoko S Mufwene, Language, Jun., 1991, vol. 67, no. 2, p. 380-387
  - Review by John McWhorter, Language in Society, Sep., 1991, vol. 20, no. 3, p. 477-483
  - Review, G. Sankoff, American Anthropologist, Jun., 1991, vol. 93, no. 2, p. 511-512
  - Review, by P. Muysken, Journal of Linguistics, Sep., 1990, vol. 26, no. 2, p. 509-512
- An introduction to pidgins and creoles Cambridge University Press, 2000. in 596 libraries according to WorldCat
  - Review, by A. S. Kaye, Language, Jun., 2002, vol. 78, no. 2, p. 362-363
  - Review, by Patrick O. Steinkrüger, Zeitschrift für Sprachwissenschaft, 2004, vol. 23, no. 2, p. 300-301.
- Languages in contact: the partial restructuring of vernaculars Cambridge University Press, 2004. in 282 libraries according to WorldCat
  - Review by Patrick O. Steinkrüger, Zeitschrift für Sprachwissenschaft, 2006, vol. 25, no. 1, p. 154-156.
  - Review by Raymond Hickey, Anthropological linguistics. 48, no. 3, (2006): 299
  - Review by Anthony P Grant, Language in Society, Apr., 2006, vol. 35, no. 2, p. 297-300
  - Review, by D. E. Wallcek, Language, Sep., 2006, vol. 82, no. 3, p. 683
- Comparative Creole Syntax: Parallel Outlines of 18 Creole Grammars. (with Peter L. Patrick). [London]: Battlebridge, 2007.

== Articles ==
Holm, John A. 2008. "Bahamians' British Roots Traced." First published 1980 in College Forum 1: 3–10. Republished International Journal of Bahamian Studies 1: 6–9.
