= UCLA Phonological Segment Inventory Database =

Linguistic database

The UCLA Phonological Segment Inventory Database (or UPSID) is a statistical survey of the phoneme inventories in 451 of the world's languages. The database was created by American phonetician Ian Maddieson for the University of California, Los Angeles (UCLA) in 1981 to 1984 and has been updated several times.

== See also ==
- PHOIBLE

== Bibliography ==
- Maddieson, Ian. (1984). Patterns of sounds. Cambridge studies in speech science and communication. Cambridge: Cambridge University Press.
