= Annegret Bollée =

German linguist and professor (1937–2021)

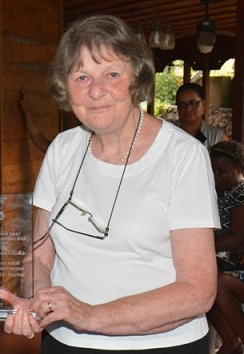
- Bollée in 2017
- Born: 4 March 1937; Berlin, Nazi Germany
- Died: 20 August 2021 (aged 84)

Academic background
- Education: University of Bonn
- Thesis: (1969)

Academic work
- Discipline: Linguist
- Notable students: Susanne Maria Michaelis
- Main interests: creole languages
- Website: Bollée on the website of the University of Bamberg

Annegret Bollée (4 March 1937 – 20 August 2021) was a German linguist and Professor Emeritus at the University of Bamberg, specializing in Romance linguistics and creole languages.

== Education and career ==
Annegret Bollée née Alsdorf was born in Berlin and grew up in Münster and Hamburg, where her father Ludwig Alsdorf was a professor of Indology. She studied English and Romance philology at the University of Hamburg, the University of Aix-Marseille and the University of Bonn. She received her doctoral degree from Bonn in 1969, with a dissertation on Latin deverbal nouns and their Romance counterparts. She became an assistant professor first in Bonn and then at the University of Cologne (in a department headed by Hans Dieter Bork), and started working on Seychelles Creole, a language with mostly French-derived vocabulary and a restructured grammatical system. She completed her habilitation degree in 1976.

Bollée became full professor of Romance linguistics at the University of Bamberg in 1978, from which she retired in 2002. She was married to the indologist Willem Bollée.

== Scientific contributions ==
Bollée is best known for her work on the history of the French-based creole languages of the Indian Ocean and of the Caribbean.

She contributed the first grammatical description of Seychelles Creole (Bollée 1977a) and contributed to the first dictionary of the language (d’Offay & Lionnet 1982). She also helped collect and edit folk stories and oral texts from the Seychelles (Bollée & Accouche 1976; Bollée & Essack 1994), and was instrumental in developing a standard orthography for writing Seychelles Creole (Bollée & d’Offay 1978). She also worked on the related Réunion Creole language (Bollee 2013), as well as its historical documentation (Bollée 2008).

Bollée has also developed a theory of creole language development that does not involve an intermediate pidgin stage (Bollée 1977b), and has worked extensively on the history of the creole languages of the Indian Ocean and the Atlantic Ocean. She edited a four-volume etymological dictionary of the French-based creoles of the Indian Ocean (1993-2007), and subsequently another four-volume etymological dictionary of the French-based creoles of the Caribbean region (2017-2018).

In 2021, she received the Lifetime Achievement Award of the Society for Pidgin and Creole Linguistics.

== Selected works ==
- Bollée, Annegret. 1977a. Le créole français des Seychelles: Esquisse d’une grammaire, textes, vocabulaire. Tübingen: Niemeyer. (https://doi.org/10.1515/9783111328874)
- Bollée, Annegret. 1977b. Zur Entstehung der französischen Kreolen-Dialekte im Indischen Ozean: Kreolisierung ohne Pidginisierung. Genève: Droz.
- Bollée, Annegret (ed.). 1993–2007. Dictionnaire étymologique des créoles français de l’Océan Indien (4 volumes). Hamburg: Buske.
- Bollée, Annegret. 2008. Deux textes religieux de Bourbon du 18e siècle et l’histoire du creole. London: Battlebridge Publications.
- Bollée, Annegret. 2013. Reunion Creole. In: Michaelis, Susanne Maria & Maurer, Philippe & Haspelmath, Martin & Huber, Magnus (eds.) The survey of pidgin and creole languages, Volume 2: Portuguese-based, Spanish-based, and French-based Languages. Oxford: Oxford University Press (https://apics-online.info/surveys/54).
- Bollée, Annegret (ed.). 2017–2018. Dictionnaire étymologique des créoles français d’Amérique (4 volumes). Hamburg: Buske.
- Bollée, Annegret & Accouche, Samuel. 1976. Ti anan en foi en Soungoula: Creole stories from the Seychelles. Cologne: University of Cologne, Romance Studies.
- Bollée, Annegret & d’Offay, Danielle. 1978. Apprenons la nouvelle orthographe: Proposition d’une orthographe rationnelle pour le créole des Seychelles avec six contes créoles seyechellois. Cologne: Chez les auteurs.
- Bollée, Annegret & Rosalie, Marcel (eds). 1994. Parol ek memwar: Récits de vie des Seychelles. Hamburg: Buske.
- Bollée, Annegret & Neumann-Holzschuh, Ingrid. 2017. Spanische Sprachgeschichte. Stuttgart: Klett.
- Bollée, Annegret & Reutner, Ursula. 2007. Beiträge zur Kreolistik: Als Festgabe für Annegret Bollée zum 70. Geburtstag. Hamburg: Buske. (https://www.academia.edu/43848916/Im_Gespr%C3%A4ch_mit_Annegret_Boll%C3%A9e)
- d’Offay, Danielle & Lionnet, Guy (eds.). 1982. Diksyonner kreol-franse / Dictionnaire créole seychellois-français (Kreolische Bibliothek 3). Hamburg: Buske.
