= Glottochronology =

Part of lexicostatistics

Glottochronology (from Attic Greek γλῶττα 'tongue, language' and χρόνος 'time') is the part of lexicostatistics which involves comparative linguistics and deals with the chronological relationship between languages.

The idea was developed by Morris Swadesh in the 1950s in his article on Salish internal relationships. He developed the idea under two assumptions: there indeed exists a relatively stable basic vocabulary (referred to as Swadesh lists) in all languages of the world; and, any replacements happen in a way analogous to radioactive decay in a constant percentage per time elapsed. Using mathematics and statistics, Swadesh developed an equation to determine when languages separated and give an approximate time of when the separation occurred. His methods aimed to aid linguistic anthropologists by giving them a definitive way to determine a separation date between two languages. The formula provides an approximate number of centuries since two languages were supposed to have separated from a singular common ancestor. His methods also purported to provide information on when ancient languages may have existed.

Despite multiple studies and literature containing the information of glottochronology, it is not widely used today and is surrounded with controversy. Glottochronology tracks language separation from thousands of years ago but many linguists are skeptical of the concept because it is more of a 'probability' rather than a 'certainty.' On the other hand, some linguists may say that glottochronology is gaining traction because of its relatedness to archaeological dates. Glottochronology is not as accurate as archaeological data, but some linguists still believe that it can provide a solid estimate.

Over time many different extensions of the Swadesh method evolved; however, Swadesh's original method is so well known that 'glottochronology' is usually associated with him.

== Methodology ==
The original method of glottochronology presumed that the core vocabulary of a language is replaced at a constant (or constant average) rate across all languages and cultures and so can be used to measure the passage of time. The process makes use of a list of lexical terms and morphemes which are similar to multiple languages.

Lists were compiled by Morris Swadesh and assumed to be resistant against borrowing (originally designed in 1952 as a list of 200 items, but the refined 100-word list in Swadesh (1955) is much more common among modern day linguists).

The core vocabulary was designed to encompass concepts common to every human language such as personal pronouns, body parts, heavenly bodies and living beings, verbs of basic actions, numerals, basic adjectives, kin terms, and natural occurrences and events. Through a basic word list, one eliminates concepts that are specific to a particular culture or time period. It has been found through differentiating word lists that the ideal is really impossible and that the meaning set may need to be tailored to the languages being compared. Word lists are not homogenous throughout studies and they are often changed and designed to suit both languages being studied. Linguists find that it is difficult to find a word list where all words used are culturally unbiased. Many alternative word lists have been compiled by other linguists and often use fewer meaning slots.

The percentage of cognates (words with a common origin) in the word lists is then measured. The larger the percentage of cognates, the more recently the two languages being compared are presumed to have separated.

=== Glottochronologic constant ===
Determining word lists rely on morpheme decay or change in vocabulary. Morpheme decay must stay at a constant rate for glottochronology to be applied to a language. This leads to a critique of the glottochronologic formula because some linguists argue that the morpheme decay rate is not guaranteed to stay the same throughout history.

American Linguist Robert Lees obtained a value for the "glottochronological constant" (r) of words by considering the known changes in 13 pairs of languages using the 200 word list. He obtained a value of 0.8048 ± 0.0176 with 90% confidence. For his 100-word list Swadesh obtained a value of 0.86, the higher value reflecting the elimination of semantically unstable words.

=== Divergence time ===
The basic formula of glottochronology proposed by Morris Swadesh is:

$$t = -\frac{\ln(c)}{2\ln(r)}$$

t = a given period of time from one stage of the language to another (measured in millennia), c = proportion of wordlist items retained at the end of that period and r = rate of replacement for that word list.

By testing historically verifiable cases in which t is known by nonlinguistic data (such as the approximate distance from Classical Latin to modern Romance languages), Swadesh arrived at the empirical value of approximately 0.14 for L, (c?) which means that the rate of replacement constitutes around 14 words from the 100-wordlist per millennium. This is represented in the table below.

Glottochronology Time Scale
Rough Median Dating	Median Cognate Retention in 100-Word List
500 BP	86%
1000 BP	74%
1500 BP	64%
2000 BP	55%
2500 BP	47%
3000 BP	40%
4000 BP	30%
5000 BP	22%
6000 BP	16%
7000 BP	12%
8000 BP	9%
9000 BP	7%
10000 BP	5%

=== Results ===
Glottochronology was applied to a range of language families, including Salishan, Indo-European, Japonic, Afro-Asiatic, Chinese and Mayan and other American languages.

For Amerind, correlations have been obtained with radiocarbon dating and blood groups as well as archaeology.

=== Example Wordlist ===
Below is an example of a basic word list composed of basic Turkish words and their English translations.

Glottochronological Turkish 100 Word List
hep (all)	ateş (fire)	boyun (neck)	bu (that)
kül (ashes)	balık (fish)	yeni (new)	şu (this)
kabuk (bark)	uçmak (fly)	gece (night)	sen (thou)
karın (belly)	ayak (foot)	burun (nose)	dil (tongue)
büyük (big)	vermek (give)	bir (one)	diş (tooth)
kuş (bird)	iyi (good)	kişi (person)	ağaç (tree)
ısırmak (bite)	yeşil (green)	yağmur (rain)	iki (two)
kara (black)	saç (hair)	kızıl (red)	yürümek (walk)
kan (blood)	el (hand)	yol (road)	sıcak (warm)
kemik (bone)	baş (head)	kök (root)	su (water)
yakmak (burn)	duymak (hear)	kum (sand)	biz (we)
bulut (cloud)	gönül (heart)	demek (say)	ne (what)
soğuk (cold)	ben (I)	görmek (see)	beyaz (white)
gelmek (come)	öldürmek (kill)	tohum (seed)	kim (who)
ölmek (die)	bilmek (know)	oturmak (sit)	kadın (woman)
köpek (dog)	yaprak (leaf)	deri (skin)	sarı (yellow)
içmek (drink)	yalan (lie)	uyumak (sleep)	uzun (long)
kuru (dry)	ciğer (liver)	küçük (small)	yok (not)
kulak (ear)	bit (louse)	duman (smoke)	göğüş (breast)
yer (earth)	erkek (man-male)	ayaktakalmak (stand)	hayvan tırnagı (claw)
yemek (eat)	çok (many)	yıldız (star)	dolu (full)
yumurta (egg)	et (meat-flesh)	taş (stone)	boynuz (horn)
göz (eye)	dağ (mountain)	güneş (sun)	diz (knee)
yağ (fat-grease)	ağız (mouth)	yüzmek (swim)	ay (moon)
tüy (feather)	isim (name)	kuyruk (tail)	yuvarlak (round)

== Discussion ==
The concept of language change is old, and its history is reviewed in Hymes (1973) and Wells (1973). In some sense, glottochronology is a reconstruction of history and can often be closely related to archaeology. Many linguistic studies find the success of glottochronology to be found alongside archaeological data. Glottochronology itself dates back to the mid-20th century. An introduction to the subject is given in Embleton (1986) and in McMahon and McMahon (2005).

Glottochronology has been controversial ever since, partly because of issues of accuracy but also because of the question of whether its basis is sound (for example, Bergsland 1958; Bergsland and Vogt 1962; Fodor 1961; Chrétien 1962; Guy 1980). The concerns have been addressed by Dobson et al. (1972), Dyen (1973) and Kruskal, Dyen and Black (1973). The assumption of a single-word replacement rate can distort the divergence-time estimate when borrowed words are included (Thomason and Kaufman 1988).

The presentations vary from "Why linguists don't do dates" to the one by Starostin discussed below. Since its original inception, glottochronology has been rejected by many linguists, mostly Indo-Europeanists of the school of the traditional comparative method. Criticisms have been answered in particular around three points of discussion:

- Criticism levelled against the higher stability of lexemes in Swadesh lists alone (Haarmann 1990) misses the point because a certain amount of losses only enables the computations (Sankoff 1970). The non-homogeneity of word lists often leads to lack of understanding between linguists. Linguists also have difficulties finding a completely unbiased list of basic cultural words. it can take a long time for linguists to find a viable word list which can take several test lists to find a usable list.
- Traditional glottochronology presumes that language changes at a stable rate.

Thus, in Bergsland & Vogt (1962), the authors make an impressive demonstration, on the basis of actual language data verifiable by extralinguistic sources, that the "rate of change" for Icelandic constituted around 4% per millennium, but for closely connected Riksmal (Literary Norwegian), it would amount to as much as 20% (Swadesh's proposed "constant rate" was supposed to be around 14% per millennium).
That and several other similar examples effectively proved that Swadesh's formula would not work on all available material, which is a serious accusation since evidence that can be used to "calibrate" the meaning of L (language history recorded during prolonged periods of time) is not overwhelmingly large in the first place.
It is highly likely that the chance of replacement is different for every word or feature ("each word has its own history", among hundreds of other sources:).
That global assumption has been modified and downgraded to single words, even in single languages, in many newer attempts (see below).
There is a lack of understanding of Swadesh's mathematical/statistical methods. Some linguists reject the methods in full because the statistics lead to 'probabilities' when linguists trust 'certainties' more.

- A serious argument is that language change arises from socio-historical events that are, of course, unforeseeable and, therefore, uncomputable.

== Modifications ==
Somewhere in between the original concept of Swadesh and the rejection of glottochronology in its entirety lies the idea that glottochronology as a formal method of linguistic analysis becomes valid with the help of several important modifications. Thus, inhomogeneities in the replacement rate were dealt with by Van der Merwe (1966) by splitting the word list into classes each with their own rate, while Dyen, James and Cole (1967) allowed each meaning to have its own rate. Simultaneous estimation of divergence time and replacement rate was studied by Kruskal, Dyen and Black.

Brainard (1970) allowed for chance cognation, and drift effects were introduced by Gleason (1959). Sankoff (1973) suggested introducing a borrowing parameter and allowed synonyms.

A combination of the various improvements is given in Sankoff's "Fully Parameterised Lexicostatistics". In 1972, Sankoff in a biological context developed a model of genetic divergence of populations. Embleton (1981) derives a simplified version of that in a linguistic context. She carries out a number of simulations using this which are shown to give good results.

Improvements in statistical methodology related to a completely different branch of science, phylogenetics; the study of changes in DNA over time sparked a recent renewed interest. The new methods are more robust than the earlier ones because they calibrate points on the tree with known historical events and smooth the rates of change across them. As such, they no longer require the assumption of a constant rate of change (Gray & Atkinson 2003).

=== Starostin's method ===
Another attempt to introduce such modifications was performed by the Russian linguist Sergei Starostin, who had proposed the following:

- Systematic loanwords, borrowed from one language into another, are a disruptive factor and must be eliminated from the calculations; the one thing that really matters is the "native" replacement of items by items from the same language. The failure to notice that factor was a major reason in Swadesh's original estimation of the replacement rate at under 14 words from the 100-wordlist per millennium, but the real rate is much slower (around 5 or 6). Introducing that correction effectively cancels out the "Bergsland & Vogt" argument since a thorough analysis of the Riksmal data shows that its basic wordlist includes about 15 to 16 borrowings from other Germanic languages (mostly Danish), and the exclusion of those elements from the calculations brings the rate down to the expected rate of 5 to 6 "native" replacements per millennium.
- The rate of change is not really constant but depends on the time period during which the word has existed in the language (the chance of lexeme X being replaced by lexeme Y increases in direct proportion to the time elapsed, the so-called "aging of words" is empirically understood as gradual "erosion" of the word's primary meaning under the weight of acquired secondary ones).
- Individual items on the 100 word-list have different stability rates (for instance, the word "I" generally has a much lower chance of being replaced than the word "yellow").

The resulting formula, taking into account both the time dependence and the individual stability quotients, looks as follows:

$$t = \sqrt \frac{\ln(c)}{-Lc}$$

In that formula, −Lc reflects the gradual slowing down of the replacement process because of different individual rates since the least stable elements are the first and the quickest to be replaced, and the square root represents the reverse trend, the acceleration of replacement as items in the original wordlist "age" and become more prone to shifting their meaning. This formula is obviously more complicated than Swadesh's original one, but, it yields, as shown by Starostin, more credible results than the former and more or less agrees with all the cases of language separation that can be confirmed by historical knowledge. On the other hand, it shows that glottochronology can really be used only as a serious scientific tool on language families whose historical phonology has been meticulously elaborated (at least to the point of being able to distinguish between cognates and loanwords clearly).

== See also ==
- Basic English
- Cognate
- Dolgopolsky list
- Historical linguistics
- Indo-European studies
- Leipzig–Jakarta list
- Lexicostatistics
- Mass lexical comparison
- Proto-language
- Quantitative comparative linguistics
- Swadesh list

== Bibliography ==
- Bergsland, Knut; & Vogt, Hans. (1962). On the validity of glottochronology. Current Anthropology, 3, 115–153.
- Brainerd, Barron (1970). A Stochastic Process related to Language Change. Journal of Applied Probability 7, 69–78.
- Callaghan, Catherine A. (1991). Utian and the Swadesh list. In J. E. Redden (Ed.), Papers for the American Indian language conference, held at the University of California, Santa Cruz, July and August, 1991 (pp. 218–237). Occasional papers on linguistics (No. 16). Carbondale: Department of Linguistics, Southern Illinois University.
- Campbell, Lyle. (1998). Historical Linguistics; An Introduction [Chapter 6.5]. Edinburgh: Edinburgh University Press. ISBN 0-7486-0775-7.
- Chretien, Douglas (1962). The Mathematical Models of Glottochronology. Language 38, 11–37.
- Crowley, Terry (1997). An introduction to historical linguistics. 3rd ed. Auckland: Oxford Univ. Press. pp. 171–193.
- Dyen, Isidore (1965). "A Lexicostatistical classification of the Austronesian languages." International Journal of American Linguistics, Memoir 19.
- Gray, R.D. & Atkinson, Q.D. (2003): "Language-tree divergence times support the Anatolian theory of Indo-European origin." Nature 426–435–439.
- Gudschinsky, Sarah. (1956). The ABC's of lexicostatistics (glottochronology). Word, 12, 175–210.
- Haarmann, Harald. (1990). "Basic vocabulary and language contacts; the disillusion of glottochronology. In Indogermanische Forschungen 95:7ff.
- Hockett, Charles F. (1958). A course in modern linguistics (Chap. 6). New York: Macmillan.
- Hoijer, Harry. (1956). Lexicostatistics: A critique. Language, 32, 49–60.
- Holm, Hans J. (2003). The Proportionality Trap. Or: What is wrong with lexicostatistical Subgrouping.Indogermanische Forschungen, 108, 38–46.
- Holm, Hans J. (2005). Genealogische Verwandtschaft. Kap. 45 in Quantitative Linguistik; ein internationales Handbuch. Herausgegeben von R.Köhler, G. Altmann, R. Piotrowski, Berlin: Walter de Gruyter.
- Holm, Hans J. (2007). The new Arboretum of Indo-European 'Trees'; Can new algorithms reveal the Phylogeny and even Prehistory of IE?. Journal of Quantitative Linguistics 14-2:167–214
- Hymes, Dell H. (1960). Lexicostatistics so far. Current Anthropology, 1 (1), 3–44.
- McWhorter, John. (2001). The power of Babel. New York: Freeman. ISBN 978-0-7167-4473-3.
- Nettle, Daniel. (1999). Linguistic diversity of the Americas can be reconciled with a recent colonization. in PNAS 96(6):3325–9.
- Sankoff, David (1970). "On the Rate of Replacement of Word-Meaning Relationships." Language 46.564–569.
- Sjoberg, Andree; & Sjoberg, Gideon. (1956). Problems in glottochronology. American Anthropologist, 58 (2), 296–308.
- Starostin, Sergei. Methodology Of Long-Range Comparison. 2002. pdf
- Thomason, Sarah Grey, and Kaufman, Terrence. (1988). Language Contact, Creolization, and Genetic Linguistics. Berkeley: University of California Press.
- Tischler, Johann, 1973. Glottochronologie und Lexikostatistik [Innsbrucker Beiträge zur Sprachwissenschaft 11]; Innsbruck.
- Wittmann, Henri (1969). "A lexico-statistic inquiry into the diachrony of Hittite." Indogermanische Forschungen 74.1–10.
- Wittmann, Henri (1973). "The lexicostatistical classification of the French-based Creole languages." Lexicostatistics in genetic linguistics: Proceedings of the Yale conference, April 3–4, 1971, dir. Isidore Dyen, 89–99. La Haye: Mouton.
- Zipf, George K. (1965). The Psychobiology of Language: an Introduction to Dynamic Philology. Cambridge, MA: M.I.T.Press.
