= Cecil H. Brown =

American linguist

- Born: Cecil Hooper Brown II; 1944 (age 81–82); United States
- Occupations: Linguist, anthropologist

Academic background
- Education: Tulane University

Academic work
- Institutions: Northern Illinois University
- Main interests: Mayan languages

Cecil H. Brown (born 1944) is an American linguist and anthropologist. He is a distinguished research professor emeritus of anthropology at Northern Illinois University. His work relates to comparative linguistics and ethnobiology.

== Early life ==
Brown grew up in Jackson, Tennessee. Both his father and grandfather were physicians. As a young person, Brown was not interested in medicine, but knew he would go on to get a PhD.

== Education ==
Brown attended Tulane University for his undergraduate and graduate degrees, receiving a B.A. in 1966 and PhD in 1971. As an undergraduate, he studied British social anthropology abroad for one year. He then became interested in the work of Stephen A. Tyler and the new field of cognitive anthropology. Brown conducted fieldwork with the Huastec people, a Mayan group of northern Veracruz, Mexico. He investigated cognitive anthropology of kinship, color, disease, plants, and animals. In 1982, he attended his first ethnobiology meeting in Colombia.

== Career ==
In 1998, Brown became a distinguished research professor. He was a visiting scientist in the linguistics department at the Max Planck Institute for Evolutionary Anthropology in 2001. After 32 years of teaching anthropology and linguistics, Brown retired from teaching in 2002. In 2015, Brown was awarded the Distinguished Ethnobiologist Award from the Society of Ethnobiology.

Brown is co-founder of the Automated Similarity Judgment Program (ASJP).

== Selected publications ==
- Brown, Cecil H. Wittgensteinian linguistics. De Gruyter Mouton, 2012.
- Brown, Cecil H. Lexical acculturation in Native American languages. Oxford University Press, 1999.
- Brown, Cecil H. Language and Living Things. Rutgers University Press, 1984.
- Brown II, Cecil Hooper. An ordinary language approach to transformational grammar and to formal semantic analysis of Huastec terminological systems. Tulane University, 1971.
