= Simon Greenhill =

New Zealand scientist

- Born: Simon James Greenhill
- Occupation: Scientist

Academic background
- Education: University of Auckland
- Thesis: The archives of history : a phylogenetic approach to the study of language (2008)
- Doctoral advisor: Russell Gray

Academic work
- Institutions: Max Planck Institute for the Science of Human History; Australian National University
- Main interests: Evolution, computational phylogenetics, quantitative comparative linguistics

Simon James Greenhill is a New Zealand scientist who works on the application of quantitative methods to the study of cultural evolution and human prehistory. He is well known for creating and building various linguistics databases, including the Austronesian Basic Vocabulary Database, TransNewGuinea.org, Pulotu, and many others. In addition to Austronesian, he has contributed to the study of the phylogeny of many language families, including Dravidian and Sino-Tibetan.

He is a graduate of University of Auckland, New Zealand. The title of his 2008 doctoral thesis is The archives of history: a phylogenetic approach to the study of language.

Greenhill is currently a scientist affiliated with the Australian National University in Canberra, Australia, and the Max Planck Institute for the Science of Human History in Jena, Germany.
