= David Gil (linguist) =

British linguist

- Born: 1 November 1953 (age 72)
- Occupation: Linguist

Academic background
- Education: Massachusetts Institute of Technology

David Gil (born 1 November 1953 in London, United Kingdom) is a British linguist specializing in Indonesian and Malay linguistics. His research interests include Malayic comparative linguistics, syntax, semantics, linguistic typology, and language evolution.

== Education ==
In 1972, he received a B.A. in mathematics at the Massachusetts Institute of Technology. He completed his master's degree in linguistics in 1978 at the University of Tel Aviv. In 1982, he defended his PhD thesis Distributive Numerals at the University of California, Los Angeles.

== Publications ==
- Riau Indonesian: A Language without Reference and Predication? (1999)
- Colloquial Indonesian Dialects: How Real Are They? (2003)
- The World Atlas of Language Structures (2005)
- What is Riau Indonesian? (2009)
- Language Complexity as an Evolving Variable (2009)

== Conferences ==
Gil regularly organises academic conferences on the languages of Indonesia, such as the International Symposium on Malay/Indonesian Linguistics (ISMIL), International Symposium on the Languages of Java (ISLOJ), and Workshop on the Languages of Papua (WLP).
