= Susanne Maria Michaelis =

German creole linguist (born 1962)

Susanne Maria Michaelis (born March 30, 1962, in Aachen) is a specialist in creole linguistics who is affiliated with the Max Planck Institute for Evolutionary Anthropology in Leipzig. She was previously at Leipzig University and at the Max Planck Institute for the Science of Human History in Jena.

She studied Romance linguistics at the University of Bonn, the University of Poitiers and the University of Freiburg, working with Wolfgang Raible and Annegret Bollée. Between 1991 and 1998 she was an assistant professor at the University of Bamberg. She received her Ph.D. thesis with a work on complex syntax in Seychelles Creole (Michaelis 1994), and she also worked on tense and aspect in Seychelles Creole, challenging Derek Bickerton's language bioprogram hypothesis. In more recent work, she has focused on the role of substrate languages in creole genesis (e.g. Michaelis 2008), and on asymmetric coding in creole languages (e.g. Michaelis 2019).

Michaelis is best known for coordinating and coediting the Atlas of Pidgin and Creole Language Structures (2013).

== Books ==
- 1993. Temps et aspect an créole seychellois: valeurs et interférences [Kreolische Bibliothek 11]. Hamburg: Buske.
- 1994. Komplexe Syntax im Seychellen-Kreol: Verknüpfung von Sachverhaltsdarstellungen zwischen Mündlichkeit und Schriftlichkeit [ScriptOralia 49]. Tübingen: Narr.
- 1996. [Susanne Michaelis & Doris Tophinke] (eds.). Texte – Konstitution, Verarbeitung, Typik. München: Lincom.
- 1996. [Susanne Michaelis & Petra Thiele] (eds.). Grammatikalisierung in der Romania. Beiträge zur Teilsektion 1b des XXIV. Romanistentages in Münster, 25.-28.9.1995. Bochum: Brockmeyer.
- 2008. [Susanne Michaelis, ed.] Roots of creole structures: Weighing the contributions of substrates and superstrates [Creole Language Library 33]. Amsterdam/Philadelphia: Benjamins.
- 2008. John A. Holm & Susanne Michaelis (eds.). Contact Languages: Critical concepts in linguistics, 5 volumes. London/New York: Routledge.
- 2013. [Michaelis, Susanne Maria, Maurer, Philippe, Haspelmath, Martin & Huber, Magnus] (eds.). 2013a. The Atlas of Pidgin and Creole Language Structures. Oxford: Oxford University Press.
- 2013. [Michaelis, Susanne Maria, Maurer, Philippe, Haspelmath, Martin & Huber, Magnus] (eds.). 2013b. The Survey of Pidgin and Creole Languages, Volumes 1-3. Oxford: Oxford University Press.
- 2013. [Michaelis, Susanne Maria & Maurer, Philippe & Haspelmath, Martin & Huber, Magnus] (Eds.). 2013c. The Atlas of Pidgin and Creole Language Structures Online. Leipzig: Max Planck Institute for Evolutionary Anthropology.
- 2019. Support from creole languages for functional adaptation in grammar: Dependent and independent possessive person-forms. In Schmidtke-Bode, Karsten & Levshina, Natalia & Michaelis, Susanne Maria & Seržant, Ilja A. (eds.), Explanation in typology, 179–201. Berlin: Language Science Press. (https://langsci-press.org/catalog/book/220)
