= Atlas of Pidgin and Creole Language Structures =

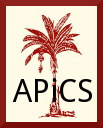
APiCS website logo.

The Atlas of Pidgin and Creole Language Structures (APiCS) is a comparative linguistic atlas of contact languages. It exists as a four volume publication and online database in the form of a website APiCS Online.

The atlas was edited by Susanne Maria Michaelis, Philippe Maurer, Martin Haspelmath, and Magnus Huber. The project ran between 2006 and 2013. The project involved 78 linguists contributing with data on languages that they are experts on. This makes APiCS different from other similar surveys of languages where there is typically one or a team of researchers gathering data on many languages by reading different descriptions. The project also has a wiki page APiCS wikipage. It is part of the Cross-Linguistic Linked Data project hosted by the Max Planck Institute for the Science of Human History.

APiCS gathers comparable synchronic data on the grammatical and lexical structures of a large number of pidgin and creole languages. The data is presented in the form of maps and profile pages for each language. The profile pages for the languages also includes sociohistorical information about each language. The published physical volumes contains more information of this kind than the online version.

== Languages included ==
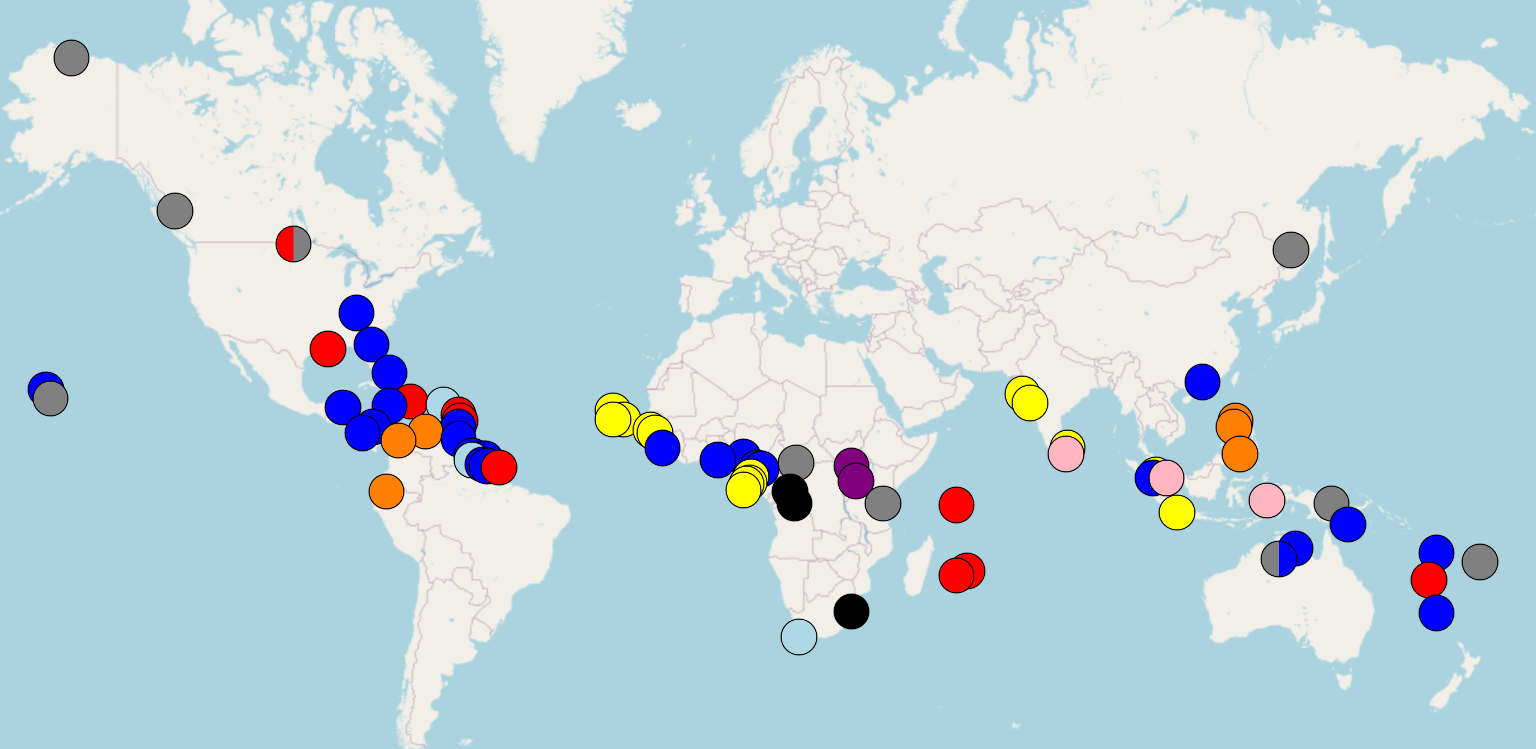
Map of the languages listed in APiCS.

The project covers 76 contact languages (pidgins, creoles and mixed languages). The language set contains not only the most widely studied Atlantic and Indian Ocean creoles, but also less well known pidgins and creoles from Africa, South Asia, Southeast Asia, Melanesia and Australia, including some extinct varieties. The Atlas does not make any classification into what is and what is not a pidgin/creole/mixed language. It is up to the readers and users of the database to make these classifications. This is a very important point, as it is inappropriate to refer to all languages in the APiCS as creoles.

Each language is the responsibility of a single author or a team of authors, which were requested to fill out a questionnaire for the 130 structural features and to write a sociohistorical and grammatical survey article for their language. There are also 18,525 audio examples online to illustrate the features for each language.

== Structural features ==
The database consists of 130 structural features which are drawn from all areas of grammar: phonology, morphology, syntax and lexicon. A feature has between two and nine values, shown on the maps by different colours and shapes of the language symbols. The online version of the database includes interactive map display and various filtering and search functions, allowing users to address various research questions. Furthermore, the online version also includes sound files of every language, enabling the users to listen to a short text that is glossed and translated.

One of the important differences between APiCS and World Atlas of Language Structures, as well as other earlier surveys of languages, is that APiCS allows for languages to be coded for more than one strategy. For example, in the WALS there is one feature for the order of Subject, Object and Verb. Each language in WALS is coded as having one of the orders, or "no dominant order". In APiCS there is a mirror feature, but here each language can be coded for having more than one order and the distribution is given in percentages. The language Media Lengua for example is coded as having 30% SVO and 70% SOV.

Contributors cannot select any percentage, they choose between the following:

- exclusively (100%)
- pervasive (90%)
- majority (70%)
- about half (50%)
- minority (30%)
- marginal (10%)

When a summary is given for a feature users are displayed both with information on how many languages are coded as that value exclusively or as shared. There are for example 61% languages in APiCS that are coded as exclusively having the order SVO, and 10 that are coded as having that order and other orders as well (shared).

== APiCS and the World Atlas of Language Structures (WALS) ==
APiCS was inspired by the World Atlas of Language Structures (WALS), which shows the geographical distribution of 142 features in an average of 400 languages worldwide. Pidgins and creoles were not completely excluded from WALS, but since the primary goal was to present the precolonial linguistic areas, pidgins and creoles were backgrounded. APiCS contains 48 features on which information is also available in WALS APiCS-WALS, so that creoles and pidgins can readily be compared with their substrate and superstrate languages, as well as with the world's languages in general. However, APiCS does not copy WALS blindly, but adds many features that did not make it into WALS but are important for contact languages. Other features that appear in WALS have been modified to suit the needs of the APiCS users.

As stated above, one of the major differences between WALS and APiCS is that APiCS allows for multiple values for one feature whereas WALS does not.
