= Morris Swadesh =

American linguist (1909–1967)

- Born: January 22, 1909; Holyoke, Massachusetts, U.S.
- Died: July 20, 1967 (aged 58); Mexico City, Mexico
- Known for: Swadesh list

Academic background
- Education: University of Chicago (B.A., M.A.); Yale University (Ph.D.)
- Thesis: The Internal Economy of the Nootka Word (1933)
- Doctoral advisor: Edward Sapir

Academic work
- Discipline: Linguist
- Institutions: University of Wisconsin in Madison; City College of New York; National Autonomous University of Mexico; University of Alberta
- Main interests: Historical linguistics; Glottochronology; Lexicostatistics; Indigenous languages of the Americas

Morris Swadesh (/ˈswɑːdɛʃ/ SWAH-desh; January 22, 1909 – July 20, 1967) was an American linguist who specialized in comparative and historical linguistics, and developed his mature career at UNAM in Mexico. Swadesh was born in Massachusetts to Bessarabian Jewish immigrant parents. He completed bachelor's and master's degrees at the University of Chicago, studying under Edward Sapir, and then followed Sapir to Yale University where he completed a Ph.D. in 1933. Swadesh taught at the University of Wisconsin–Madison from 1937 to 1939, and then during World War II worked on projects with the United States Army and Office of Strategic Services. He became a professor at the City College of New York after the war's end, but was fired in 1949 due to his membership in the Communist Party. He spent most of the rest of his life teaching in Mexico and Canada.

Swadesh had a particular interest in the indigenous languages of the Americas, and conducted extensive fieldwork throughout North America. He was one of the pioneers of glottochronology and lexicostatistics, and is known for his creation of the Swadesh list, a compilation of basic concepts thought to be present across cultures and thus suitable for cross-linguistic comparison. Swadesh believed that his techniques could discover deep relationships between apparently unrelated languages, thus allowing for the identification of macrofamilies and possibly even a "Proto-Human" language. His theories were often controversial, and some have been deprecated by later linguists.

== Early life and education ==
Swadesh was born in 1909 in Holyoke, Massachusetts, to Jewish immigrant parents from Bessarabia. His parents were multilingual, and he grew up with Yiddish, some Russian, and English as his first languages.

Swadesh earned his B.A. and M.A. from the University of Chicago, where he began studying with the linguist Edward Sapir. He followed Sapir to Yale University, where he earned his Ph.D. in 1933. Inspired by Sapir's early lists of word similarities among Native American languages, he began his life's work in comparative linguistics.

== Early career ==
In the 1930s, Swadesh conducted extensive fieldwork on more than 20 indigenous languages of the Americas, with travels in Canada, Mexico, and the US. He worked most prominently on the Chitimacha language, a now-extinct language isolate found among indigenous people of Louisiana. His fieldnotes and subsequent publications constitute the main source of information on this extinct language. He also conducted smaller amounts of fieldwork on the Menominee and Mahican languages, in Wisconsin and New York, respectively; both are part of the Algonquian language family.

Swadesh taught linguistics and anthropology at the University of Wisconsin in Madison from 1937 to 1939. During this time he devised and organized the highly original Oneida Language and Folklore Project. This program hired more than a dozen Oneida Indians in Wisconsin for a WPA project (under the Franklin D. Roosevelt administration) to record and translate texts in the Oneida language. (The Oneida were historically one of the five nations of the Iroquois Confederacy, with their historic territory located in central New York state, but some had moved to Wisconsin in the 19th century.) In this same period in other WPA projects, writers were recording state histories and guides, and researchers were collecting oral histories of African Americans who had been born into slavery before the end of the Civil War.

Swadesh was let go by the University of Wisconsin just as he was to begin the project. Floyd Lounsbury, then an undergraduate, was assigned to finish it. Lounsbury continued his studies in linguistics, later serving as Sterling Professor of Anthropology and Linguistics at Yale University.

In May 1939 Swadesh went to Mexico, where he had been hired to assist the government of Mexican President Lázaro Cárdenas, who was promoting the education of indigenous peoples. Swadesh learned the Purépecha language for this work. Together with rural school teachers, Swadesh worked in indigenous villages, teaching people to read first in their own languages, before teaching them Spanish. His Mexican colleagues remembered him for his impressive physical complexion, nicknaming him "The Paunch", as well as for his outspoken Communism. He worked with the Tarahumara, Purépecha, and Otomi peoples. Swadesh also learned Spanish in less than a year; he was fluent enough that he was able to give a series of linguistics lectures (in Spanish) at the Universidad Michoacana de San Nicolás de Hidalgo and publish his first book, La Nueva Filologia, in Spanish in 1941.

Returning to the U.S., during the Second World War Swadesh worked on military projects for the U.S. Army and the OSS to compile reference materials on Burmese, Chinese, Russian, and Spanish. He also wrote easy-to-learn textbooks for troops to learn Russian and Chinese.

Swadesh served in Burma, where Lt. Roger Hilsman described his linguistic skills as extraordinary. Swadesh learned enough of the Naga language, after spending only one day with a local guide, that he was able to give a ten-minute thank-you speech in that language. Hilsman recalled that Swadesh had been strongly opposed to racial segregation in the United States.

== Red Scare ==
In May 1949, Swadesh was fired by the City College of New York (CCNY) due to accusations that he was a Communist. That was during the Red Scare, and he was one of a number of anthropologists and other academics to be deprived of their employment during the McCarthy Era. Swadesh had been a member of the Denver Communist Party and was active in the protest movement against the execution of convicted spies, Julius and Ethel Rosenberg. Swadesh continued to work in the United States until 1954, aided by limited funding from the American Philosophical Society of Philadelphia.

== Later career ==
In 1956 Swadesh returned to Mexico, where he took a position as researcher at the National Autonomous University of Mexico and taught linguistics at the National School of Anthropology and History (Escuela Nacional de Antropología e Historia), in Mexico City.

In 1966, he was appointed Professor of General Linguistics at the University of Alberta in Canada. He was developing plans for a major research project in Western Canada at the time of his death, in the summer of 1967.

== Work in historical linguistics ==
Swadesh is best known for his work in historical linguistics. Any language changes over centuries (consider, for example, the changes in English since the Middle Ages). Some languages diverge and become separate dialects, or languages that still belong to the same language family. Tracking similarities and differences between languages is part of historical linguistics. Swadesh proposed a number of distant genetic links among languages.

He was the chief pioneer of lexicostatistics, which attempts to classify languages on the basis of the extent to which they have replaced basic words reconstructible in the proto-language, and glottochronology, which extends lexicostatistics by computing divergence dates from the lexical retention rate.

Swadesh became a consultant with the International Auxiliary Language Association, which standardized Interlingua and presented it to the public in 1951 (Esterhill 2000). In this role, he originated the lists of 100 and 200 basic vocabulary items, used (with some variation) in both lexicostatistics and glottochronology for comparison among languages. They have since been known as the Swadesh lists.

Some scholars considered Swadesh as a supporter of monogenesis, the theory that all languages have a common origin: "Swadesh sought to show that all the world's languages are related in one large family" (Ruhlen 1994:215). Others believe that Swadesh proposed early linkages, but believed that languages diverged immediately among peoples, as he expressed in his major, but unfinished work, The Origin and Diversification of Language (1971), published posthumously.

== Personal life ==
Swadesh was married for a time to Mary Haas, a fellow American linguist. He later married Frances Leon, with whom he worked in Mexico in the 1930s; they divorced in the late 1950s. He married linguist Evangelina Arana after his return to Mexico in 1956.

He died in Mexico City in July 1967.

== Bibliography ==
- Swadesh, Morris; Sapir, Edward (1932). Morris, Alice V. (ed.). The Expression of the Ending-Point Relation in English, French, and German. Language Monographs No. 10. Baltimore: Linguistic Society of America. p. 125. OCLC 1400339.
- Swadesh, Morris (1933). The Internal Economy of the Nootka Word (PhD thesis). Yale University. OCLC 55489866.
- Swadesh, Morris (1934). "The Phonemic Principle a Language". Language. 10. doi:10.2307/409603. ISSN 0097-8507. JSTOR 409603. OCLC 5552875275.
- Swadesh, Morris (1937). "A Method for Phonetic Accuracy and Speed". American Anthropologist. 39 (4): 728–732. doi:10.1525/aa.1937.39.4.02a00440. ISSN 0002-7294. OCLC 5549225298.
- Swadesh, Morris; Sapir, Edward (1939). Nootka Texts. Tales and Ethnologic Narratives. William Dwight Whitney Linguistic Series. Philadelphia: Linguistic Society of America. OCLC 5254767.
- Swadesh, Morris (1940). Orientaciones Lingüísticas para Maestros en Zonas Indígenas (in Spanish). Mexico: Departamento de Asuntos Indígenas de la República Mexicana. p. 77. OCLC 419279.
- Swadesh, Morris (1940). Lounsbury, F.; Archequette, Oscar (eds.). OnΔyo-da?a.ga. Deyelihwahgwa.ta [Oneida Hymn Book] (in Oneida). Oneida, Wisconsin: Floyd Glenn Lounsbury. p. 100.
- Swadesh, Mauricio (1941). La Nueva Filología. Biblioteca del Maestro No. 4 (in Spanish). Mexico: El Nacional. p. 288. OCLC 3895563.
- Swadesh, Morris (1944). How to Pick up a Foreign Language. Washington, D.C.: Office of Strategic Services. p. 14.
- Swadesh, Morris (1945). Talking Russian before you know it. New York: H. Holt and Company. p. 134. OCLC 1225155.
- Swadesh, Morris (1945). The Words you Need in Burmese. Washington, D.C.: Office of Strategic Services. p. 35.
- Swadesh, Morris (1948). Chinese in your Pocket. New York: H. Holt and Company. p. 185. OCLC 1414110. Reprinted 1964 with the title Conversational Chinese for Beginners.
- Swadesh, Morris (1950). "Salish internal relationships". International Journal of American Linguistics. 16 (4): 157–167. doi:10.1086/464084. ISSN 0020-7071. JSTOR 1262898. OCLC 5546476900. S2CID 145122561.
- Swadesh, Morris (1951). Basic Vocabulary of Glottochronology (Mimeo). Denver: Publisher unknown.
- Swadesh, Morris (1952). "Lexico-statistic dating of prehistoric ethnic contacts". Proceedings of the American Philosophical Society. 96: 452–463. JSTOR 3143802.
- Swadesh, Morris (1954). Amerindian Non-Cultural Vocabularies. Denver: Publisher unknown. OCLC 80278568.
- Swadesh, Morris (1955). "Towards greater accuracy in lexicostatistic dating". International Journal of American Linguistics. 21 (2): 121–137. doi:10.1086/464321. ISSN 0020-7071. JSTOR 1263939. OCLC 6822154981. S2CID 144581963.
- Swadesh, Morris (1955). Amerindian Non-Cultural Vocabularies (Revised ed.). Denver: Morris Swadesh. OCLC 41054226.
- Swadesh, Morris; Sapir, Edward (1955). Native Accounts of Nootka Ethnography. Vol. 1. Bloomington: Indiana University Research Center in Anthropology, Folklore and Linguistics. p. 457. OCLC 2326833.
- Swadesh, Morris; Castro, A.; Pedraza, J.; Wallis, E. (1956). Los Otomíes hablamos en Castellano (Mimeo) (in Spanish). Mexico: Patronato Indígena del Valle del Mezquital e Instituto Lingüístico de Verano. p. 21.
- Swadesh, Morris (1956). Juegos para Aprender Castellano (in Spanish). Mexico: Instituto Indigenista Interamericano.
- Swadesh, Morris (1957). Términos de Parentesco Comunes entre Tarasco y Zuñi. Antropológica (in Spanish). Vol. 3. Mexico: Cuadernos del Instituto de Investigaciones Históricas de la Universidad Nacional Autónoma de México. p. 39. OCLC 4322563.
- Swadesh, Morris (1959). "Linguistics as an Instrument of Prehistory". Southwestern Journal of Anthropology. 15: 20–35. doi:10.1086/soutjanth.15.1.3629001. ISSN 0038-4801. OCLC 5546689895. S2CID 159796300.
- Swadesh, Morris (1959). Mapas de Clasificación Lingüística de México y las Américas. Antropológica (in Spanish). Vol. 6. Mexico: Cuadernos del Instituto de Investigaciones Históricas de la Universidad Nacional Autónoma de México. OCLC 6348889.
- Swadesh, Morris (1959). Indian Linguistic Groups of México. Mexico, D.F.: Escuela Nacional de Antropología e Historia. OCLC 6886339.
- Swadesh, Morris (1959–1960). Materiales para un Diccionario Comparativo de las Lenguas Amerindias.
- Swadesh, Morris (1960). La Lingüística como Instrumento de la Prehistoria (in Spanish). Vol. 9. Mexico: Instituto Nacional de Antropología e Historia, Dirección de Prehistoria. OCLC 1024559016.
- Swadesh, Morris; Sapir, Edward (1960). Yana Dictionary. Berkeley: University of California Press. OCLC 568976.
- Swadesh, Morris (1960). Tras la Huella Lingüística de la Prehistoria. Suplemento del Seminario de Problemas Científicos y Filosóficos, 2 (in Spanish). Vol. 26. Mexico D.F.: Universidad Nacional de México. OCLC 432897137.
- Swadesh, Morris (1960). Estudios sobre Lengua y Cultura. Acta Antropológica (in Spanish). Vol. Segunda Época, II-2. Mexico D.F.: Escuela Nacional de Antropología e Historia. OCLC 1120282110.
- Swadesh, Morris (1963). Proyecto de Libro de Lectura y de Cuaderno de Trabajo de Lengua Nacional para 6º (in Spanish). Mexico: Publisher unknown.
- Swadesh, Morris; Arana Osnaya, Evangelina (1965). Los Elementos del Mixteco Antiguo (in Spanish). Mexico: Instituto Nacional Indigenista, Inst. Nacional de Antropología e Historia. OCLC 253303664.
- Swadesh, Morris; Álvarez, María Cristina; Arzápalo, Ramón; Bastarrachea, Juan R. (1965–1968). Diccionario de Elementos de la Lengua Maya (in Spanish). Mexico: Seminario de Estudios de la Escritura Maya, Universidad Nacional Autónoma de México.
- Swadesh, Mauricio (1966). El lenguaje y la vida humana (in Spanish). Fondo de Cultura Económica. ISBN 9789681609863.
- Swadesh, Mauricio; Sancho, Madalena (1966). Los Mil Elementos del Mexicano Clásico. Base Analítica de la Lengua Nahua (in Spanish). Mexico: Instituto de Investigaciones Históricas de la UNAM. OCLC 3170252.
- Swadesh, Mauricio; Chuairy, María; Gómez, Guido (1966). El Árabe Literario (in Spanish). Mexico: El Colegio de México. OCLC 32149279.
- Swadesh, Morris; Arana, Evangelina (1967). Diccionario Analítico de la Lengua Mampruli (in Spanish). Mexico: Museo de las Culturas. OCLC 651303144.
- Swadesh, Morris (1968). Elementos del Tarasco Antiguo (in Spanish). Instituto de Investigaciones Históricas de la UNAM.
- Swadesh, Morris (1968). La Nueva Filología. Colección Obras de Mauricio Swadesh editadas por sus Alumnos (in Spanish). Vol. 1 (2nd ed.). Mexico, D.F.: E. Arana Swadesh. OCLC 1105402796.
- Swadesh, Morris (1971). The Origin and Diversification of Language. Chicago: Aldine. ISBN 9780202010014 – via Archive.org.

== See also ==
- Swadesh list
- List of linguists

== Sources ==
- Esterhill, Frank (2000). Interlingua Institute: A History. New York: Interlingua Institute.
- Newman, Stanley (1967). "Morris Swadesh (1909-1967)". Language. 43.
- Price, David H. (November 1997). Anthropologists on trial. Annual Meeting of the American Anthropological Association. Washington, DC: St. Martin’s College. Archived from the original on March 21, 2016.
- Ruhlen, Merritt (1994). On the Origin of Languages: Studies in Linguistic Taxonomy. Stanford, CA: Stanford University Press.
