= World Atlas of Language Structures =

Database of the structures of many languages

- Editor: Martin Haspelmath; Matthew S. Dryer; David Gil; Bernard Comrie
- Subject: Linguistics
- Genre: Non-fiction
- Publisher: Oxford University Press
- Publication date: October 6, 2005
- ISBN: 978-0-199-25591-7

The World Atlas of Language Structures (WALS) is a database of structural (phonological, grammatical, lexical) properties of languages gathered from descriptive materials. It was first published by Oxford University Press as a book with CD-ROM in 2005, and was released as the second edition on the Internet in April 2008 (WALS Online). It is maintained by the Max Planck Institute for Evolutionary Anthropology and by the Max Planck Digital Library. The editors are Martin Haspelmath, Matthew S. Dryer, David Gil and Bernard Comrie.

The atlas provides information on the location, linguistic affiliation and basic typological features of a great number of the world's languages. It interacts with OpenStreetMap maps. The information of the atlas is published under the Creative Commons Attribution 4.0 International license. It is part of the Cross-Linguistic Linked Data project hosted by the Max Planck Institute for the Science of Human History.

== See also ==
- Intercontinental Dictionary Series
