= Subgrouping =

Taxonomy of languages

Subgrouping in linguistics is the division of a language family into its constituent branches. In standard linguistic theory, subgroupings are determined based on shared innovations between languages.
