= Dolgopolsky list =

List of 15 stable words

The Dolgopolsky list is a word list compiled by Aharon Dolgopolsky in 1964 based on a study of 140 languages from across Eurasia. It lists the 15 lexical items that he found have the most semantic stability, i.e. the 15 words least likely to be replaced.

== List ==
The words, with the first being the most stable, are:

1. I/me
2. two/pair
3. you (singular, informal)
4. who/what
5. tongue
6. name
7. eye
8. heart
9. tooth
10. no/not
11. nail (finger-nail)
12. louse/nit
13. tear/teardrop
14. water
15. dead

The first item in the list, I/me, has been replaced in none of the 140 languages during their recorded history; the fifteenth, dead, has been replaced in 25% of the languages. The twelfth item, louse/nit, is well kept in the North Caucasian languages, Dravidian and Turkic, but not in some other proto-languages.

The Leipzig–Jakarta list of 100 lexical items includes all but five of these words: two/pair, heart, nail (fingernail), tear, die/dead.

== See also ==
- Swadesh list
- Comparative linguistics
