= Cross-Linguistic Linked Data =

Linguistics database project

- Producer: Max Planck Institute for Evolutionary Anthropology (Germany)
- Languages: English

Access
- Cost: Free

Coverage
- Disciplines: Linguistics

Links
- Website: clld.org

The Cross-Linguistic Linked Data (CLLD) project coordinated over a dozen linguistics databases covering the languages of the world. It is hosted by the Department of Linguistic and Cultural Evolution at the Max Planck Institute for Evolutionary Anthropology in Leipzig, Germany (previously at the Max Planck Institute for the Science of Human History in Jena).

CLLD was a project for publishing linguistic databases on the web, it ended in 2016. clld, on the other hand, is a web app framework - a piece of software. clld and CLDF came out of the CLLD-project but are distinct from it. CLDF data interfaces smoothly with clld web applications.

== Databases and projects ==
- Glottolog
- World Atlas of Language Structures (WALS)
- World Loanword Database (WOLD)
- Atlas of Pidgin and Creole Language Structures (APICS)
- Automated Similarity Judgment Program (ASJP)
- Intercontinental Dictionary Series (IDS)
- Electronic World Atlas of Varieties of English (eWAVE)
- A world-wide survey of affix borrowing (AfBo)
- South American Indigenous Language Structures Online (SAILS)
- PHOIBLE
- Tsammalex
- Comparative Siouan Dictionary (CSD)
- Concepticon
- Dogon languages
- Database of Cross-Linguistic Colexifications
- Glottobank (includes Lexibank, Grambank, Phonobank, Parabank, Numeralbank)
- Dictionaria
- Australian Message Stick Database (AMSD)
- Language Description Heritage (LDH)
- Cross-Linguistic Data Formats (CLDF)
- Cross-Linguistic Transcription Systems (CLTS)
- Language Description Heritage (LDH) open-access library
- IE-CoR (Indo-European Cognate Relationships)
