= Aiyangiyang =

Stone Age archaeological site in Kenya

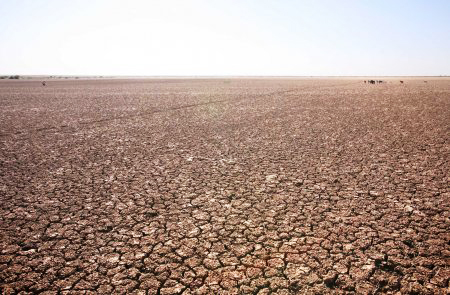
- Aiyangiyang basin in Turkana, Kenya

Highest point
- Elevation: 1,470 ft (450 m)
- Coordinates: 03°3′00″N 35°43′00″E

Geography
- Location within Kenya
- Country: Kenya
- State: Turkana

Geology
- Rock age(s): Neogene and Quaternary

Aiyangiyang is a basin in southern Turkana, Kenya, southeast of Lodwar. It is known by nomadic pastoralists for its seasonal water availability, and is an important archaeological and paleontological site with artifacts and remains from the African Middle and Late Stone Ages.

== Geography and Environment ==
Aiyangiyang is a basin and seasonal delta, sometimes described as a swamp, in Turkana County northern Kenya. In a region largely characterized by desert or scrubland, Aiyangiyang receives water flow from streams that drain northward from the western edge of the Napadet Hills. The basin is south of the Turkwel river and east of Lodwar. Aiyangiyang experiences high wind speeds and contains barchan dunes, described in a Kenyan geological survey as being adjacent to regions containing either marshes or vegetation cover.

When filled with water, Aiyangiyang's mud soils provide a temporary lake that may reach six kilometers in diameter, and becomes an important landmark for people and wildlife in the surrounding region.

== Geology and Archaeology ==
Aiyangiyang is a site of stone tools, ceramics, and ostrich eggshell jewelry, with some artifacts dating to the African Middle Stone Age. The basin is also adjacent to the Pliocene Nakechichok archaeological and paleontological site. Aiyangiyang preserves Late Stone Age stratigraphic layers including both archaeological and faunal remains throughout its basin.

Scientific research at Aiyangiyang is conducted in part by the Later Prehistory of West Turkana group.

== People Movements ==
Aiyangiyang is an important geographic feature in the itinerary of Turkana and Pokot nomads living in Southern Turkana.

== See also ==
- Lake Turkana
- Turkana Basin
- East African Rift Valley
