= Denny (hybrid hominin) =

Hominin fossil

Denny (Denisova 11)
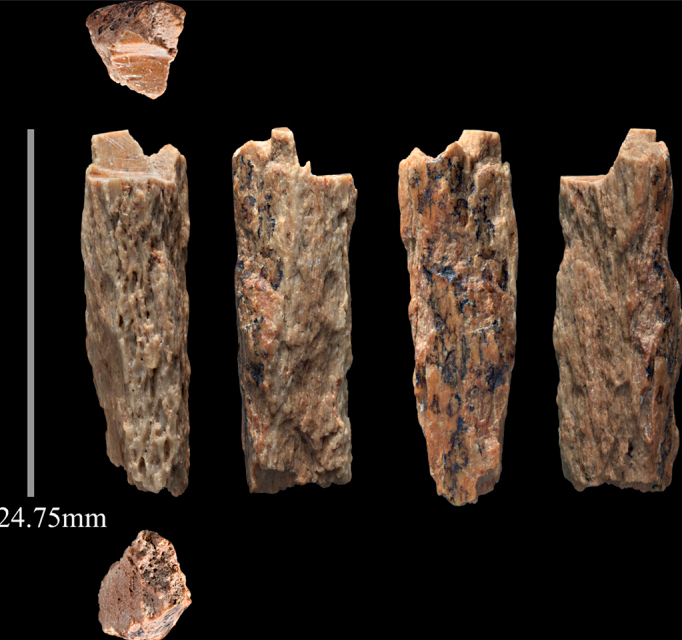
- Catalog no.: DC1227; GenBank Accession = KU131206
- Common name: Denny (Denisova 11)
- Species: 1st generation Neanderthal/Denisovan hybrid
- Age: 90,000 years
- Place discovered: Denisova Cave in the Altai Mountains, Siberia, Russia
- Date discovered: 2012
- Discovered by: Viviane Slon, Svante Pääbo, Samantha Brown, Tom Higham, Michael Buckley, Katerina Douka et al.

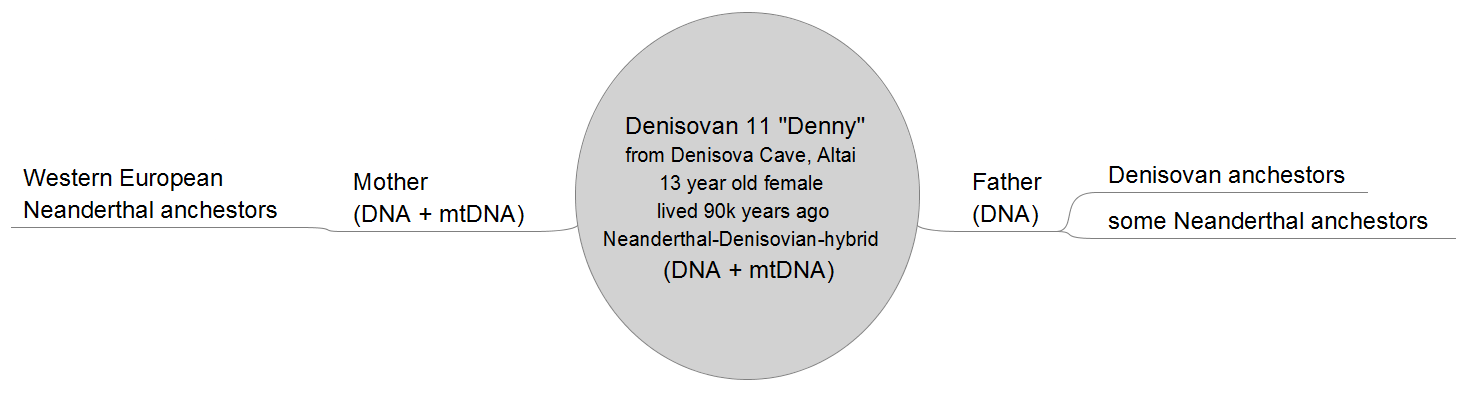
Denisova 11, genetic tree of ancestors

Denny (Denisova 11) is an ~90,000 year old fossil specimen belonging to a ~13-year-old Neanderthal-Denisovan hybrid girl. To date, she is the only first-generation hybrid hominin ever discovered. Denny's remains consist of a single fossilized fragment of a long bone discovered among over 2,000 visually unidentifiable fragments excavated at the Denisova Cave in the Altai Mountains, Russia in 2012.

A team of researchers at Oxford University led by Tom Higham used a method of collagen peptide mass fingerprinting, called Zooarchaeology by Mass Spectrometry (ZooMS), and mitochondrial DNA (mtDNA) analysis to identify the fragment as belonging to an archaic human with Neanderthal ancestry.

Genomic sequencing and analysis led by paleo-geneticists Viviane Slon and Svante Pääbo of the Max Planck Institute for Evolutionary Anthropology revealed that Denny was the offspring of a Neanderthal mother and a Denisovan father. Additionally, her genome suggests that her father also carried a small degree of Neanderthal ancestry from 300 to 600 generations prior to his lifetime.

These surprising genomic data have caused some paleontologists to speculate that interspecies mating between Denisovans and Neanderthals could have occurred with some frequency during several periods of contact over many thousands of years. Additionally, these findings lend support to the hypothesis that similar patterns of admixture, or interbreeding between archaic and modern humans, may have resulted in the partial absorption of Denisovans and Neanderthals into modern human populations.

== Overview ==
Dating analyses in 2016 determined that Denny (Denisova 11) died about 90,000 years ago, and the bone's cortical thickness indicates an age at death of at least 13 years. An analysis of the whole genome sequence (total mitochondrial and nuclear DNA) indicates she was female, with a Neanderthal mother and a Denisovan father. While previous analyses of other ancient genomes concluded that Denisovans, Neanderthals, and modern humans interbred during the ice age in Europe and Asia, this find is the most direct evidence yet that various ancient hominins mated with each other and had offspring.

Previous analyses from other fossils found in this Siberian cave have shown that modern humans, Neanderthals, and Denisovans inhabited this site at various times, and that all three human species interbred with each other. The genes of both archaic human species are present in many people today, which suggests that when these groups met, gene flow occurred. It is not evident if the mating was consensual or if Denny was fertile. The discovery of Denisova 11 may support the notion that Neanderthals and Denisovans may not have undergone direct extinction but were partly assimilated into modern human populations.

== Discovery ==
Location of Denisova Cave in the Altai Mountains of Siberia

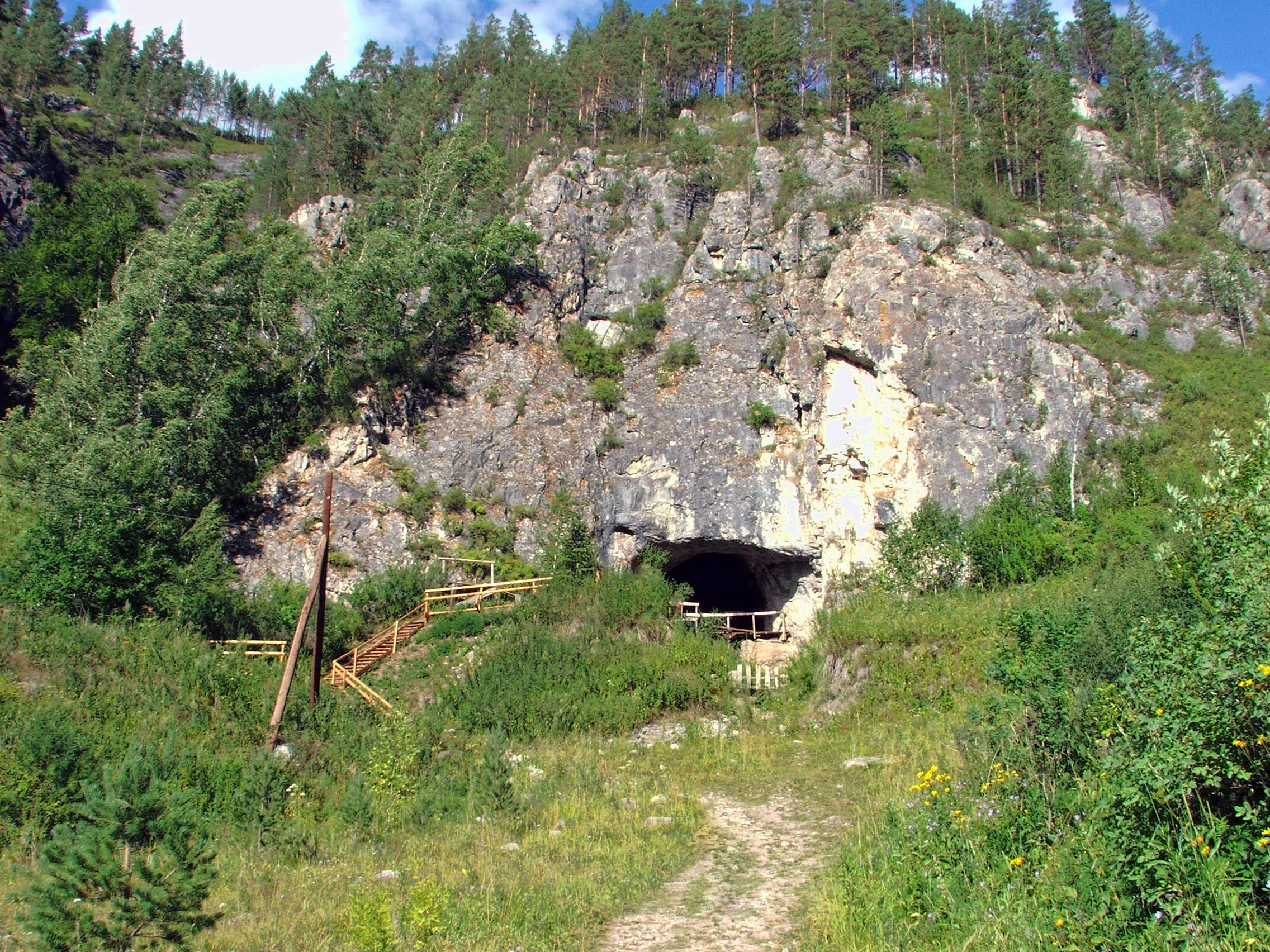
Denisova Cave in the Altai Mountains

The finding consists of a single bone fragment about 2 cm long that was unearthed in 2012 by Russian archeologists at the Denisova Cave from layer 12 of the East Gallery. The cave is located in Denisova valley, Altai Mountains in Siberia, Russia. At the time, the origin of the bone fragment remained unknown because it was archived along with thousands of other nondescript bone fragments from the cave.

In 2015, Tom Higham and Katerina Douka decided to try and apply new scientific methods to see whether they could be used to find human remains amongst the thousands of unidentified bone samples in the site. With the collaboration of the head excavators of the Denisova site; Michael Shunkov and Anatoly Derevianko, they took several bags containing thousands of unidentified bone fragments back to the University of Oxford. Samantha Brown, an MSc student at the University of Oxford, worked on the project as part of her dissertation research, screening more than 2000 bone fragments. Using Zooarchaeology by Mass Spectrometry (ZooMS) and working with the laboratory of Michael Buckley at the University of Manchester, they were able to compare the collagen protein fingerprints derived from the Denisova Cave bones to animals and humans of known origin, and they discovered that one of these bones (DC1227) belonged to an archaic human. A micro-computed tomography (Micro CT) scan of the bone done by Fiona Brock at Cranfield University helped to reveal that the specimen had acid etching and pitting on its surface indicating it may have passed through the digestion system of an animal, likely a hyena. Direct radiocarbon dating estimated the specimen to be more than 50,000 years old, and the sequencing of its mitochondrial DNA (mtDNA) at the Max Planck Institute for Evolutionary Anthropology, showed that Denisova 11 had a sequence consistent with a Neanderthal origin.

Further work by scientists at the Max Planck Institute for Evolutionary Anthropology, where previous samples of Denisovan DNA had been sequenced and analyzed uncovered further key evidence relating the specimen Viviane Slon, Svante Pääbo, and others, uncovered Denny's mixed ancestry by confirming that her mitochondrial DNA, inherited from her mother, came from Neanderthal ancestry and finding that the portion of her nuclear DNA inherited from her father was Denisovan. The publication of their results in 2018 provided the first direct evidence of archaic human interbreeding. It has been called a "landmark find" that is reshaping our understanding of how hominins interacted and could help rewrite the story of archaic and modern humans. According to population geneticist Pontus Skoglund from Harvard Medical School, currently at the Francis Crick Institute in London, "To find a first-generation person of mixed ancestry from [Neanderthal and Denisovan groups] is absolutely extraordinary. ... It's really great science coupled with a little bit of luck. It's a really clear-cut case. I think it's going to go into the textbooks right away."

== DNA analysis ==
The bone fragment, identified by the code DC1227 (GenBank Accession = KU131206) or as Denisova 11, may have originated from a human arm or leg. Prior to the extraction of material for genetic analysis, DC1227 weighed 1.68 g (0.059 oz), and had maximum dimensions of 24.7 mm (0.97 in) by 8.39 mm (0.330 in). In 2016, a team from the Max Planck Institute for Evolutionary Anthropology in Leipzig, Germany, led by paleogeneticists Viviane Slon and Svante Pääbo, extracted six DNA samples and produced ten libraries of complete genome sequences to an average coverage of 2.6-fold. Isolated mitochondrial DNA and nuclear DNA indicated the archaic human was of nearly equal proportion Neanderthal and Denisovan. A comparison of the specimen's X chromosomes and autosomes showed it belonged to a female. The estimated heterozygosity of Denisova 11, found to be comparable to present day Africans suggests that the girl was a first-generation Neanderthal-Denisovan hybrid.

Subsequent analyses showed a high likelihood that her Denisovan father also had some Neanderthal ancestry introduced into his genome hundreds of generations before his lifetime. Denisova 11's genome thus constitutes the first direct evidence for at least two instances of interbreeding between Neanderthals and Denisovans. Even more surprising, the researchers determined that the girl's mother's genome was more closely related to Western European Neanderthal DNA, excavated thousands of miles away at the Vindija Cave, Croatia, than the Neanderthals who lived in the Siberian cave where her daughter's remains were found. This finding suggests that Neanderthals migrated in multiple waves from Western Europe to Central Eurasia and encountered the Denisovans several times over a span of tens of thousands of years, and possibly coexisted with them for periods of time.

== Context and implications ==
Since the discovery of Neanderthal remains in the 19th century, many scientists have supported the hypothesis of interbreeding between archaic and modern humans, also known as hybridization, admixture, or hybrid-origin theory. The linear view of human evolution came under scrutiny in the 1970s as different species of humans were discovered that made the simplistic concept increasingly unlikely. With the advent of advanced molecular biotechnology, whole-genome sequencing of Neanderthal and human genomes were performed that confirmed recent admixture between various human species. In 2010, evidence was published revealing unambiguous examples of interbreeding between archaic and modern humans during the Middle Paleolithic and early Upper Paleolithic. Research demonstrates that interbreeding occurred in several independent events that included Neanderthals, Denisovans, as well as several unidentified hominins. Modern day Eurasian genomes contain approximately 2% Neanderthal DNA, with traces of Denisovan heritage, while modern Melanesian people have an average of 4–6% Denisovan DNA. Denny represents the first ancient individual discovered whose parents belonged to two discrete species of humans, which will provide a unique opportunity for future comparative genetic studies.

The discovery of Denny and other paleogenetic data acquired since 2010 show that human evolution should not be conceptualized as a simple linear or branched progression, but rather, as a complex interaction between related species over various periods of geographical isolation and convergence. Ackermann, Mackay, and Arnold confirm, "Recent genomic research has shown that hybridization between substantially diverged lineages is the rule, not the exception, in human evolution." Acknowledging that there is still debate over how hybridization shaped human genotypes and phenotypes, the evolutionary biologists assert that hybridization was an essential creative force in the emergence of modern humans.

In January 2019, scientists published a chronology for the Pleistocene deposits in the Denisova Cave concluding that at least two groups of humans, including Denisovans, Neanderthals, and related hybrids, occupied the Siberian site from around 300,000 to 20,000 years ago, but more material evidence is needed to prove whether they ever coexisted there. Material data collected at the site, including stone tools, bracelets, and other ornaments suggest that Denisovans may have been capable of higher order thought akin to modern humans.

In February 2019, scientists discovered evidence, based on genetics studies using artificial intelligence (AI), that suggest the existence of an unknown human ancestor species, not Neanderthal, Denisovan or human hybrid (like Denny), in the genome of modern humans.

== See also ==
- Ardi
- Dawn of Humanity, 2015 PBS documentary
- Homo naledi, an early human species hypothesized to possibly be a Homo-Australopithecus hybrid
- Human evolution
- Interbreeding between archaic and modern humans
- List of human evolution fossils
- Lucy
- Prehistoric Autopsy, 2012 BBC documentary
- Selam
- Taung Child
