= Grassridge Rockshelter =

- Site location in South Africa
- 31°34′S 26°51′E
- Location: Stormberg Mountains, South Africa
- Region: Eastern Cape

Grassridge Rockshelter is an archaeological site located in the Stormberg Mountains in the Eastern Cape province of South Africa, approximately 1,500 metres (4,900 ft) above sea level and 200 kilometres (120 mi) from the Indian Ocean. Its location puts it between multiple significant environmental regions. This makes it useful for understanding both human movement and environmental changes.

The site was first excavated in 1979, when archaeologists identified approximately 1.5 m (4 ft 11 in) of archaeological deposits. The original interpretation identified Middle Stone Age (MSA) occupation dating to around 36,000 years ago and a Late Stone Age (LSA) occupation dating to approximately 7,000–6,000 years ago. New research starting in 2014 significantly updated the chronology. The site was used on and off dating back to the Pleistocene.

Archaeological materials from the site include stone tools, faunal remains, ostrich eggshell and shell beads, and worked bone. The mid-Holocene occupation is associated with the Wilton culture and has evidence of repeated hearth construction. Ostrich eggshell beads are particularly abundant, the marine and freshwater shell beads show the connections between Grassridge occupants and other locations.

Evidence also shows that environmental conditions changed drastically during the site's occupation. The Late Pleistocene was cooler and drier, while the mid-Holocene became warmer and wetter.

View of Grassridge Rockshelter. Dashed white line is the approximate location of the overhang.

== Excavation and research history ==
Grassridge ‌Rockshelter ‌was excavated initially in 1979 by archaeologist Hermanus Opperman, as part of a study of Later Stone Age occupations in the southern foothills of the Drakensberg Mountains. Opperman described Middle Stone Age deposits dating to about 36,000 years ago and Later Stone Age deposits initially dated to about 7,000-6,000 years ago. Opperman recovered nearly 10,000 stone tools from the MSAs levels, as well as faunal remains and fragments of ostrich eggshell. The LSAs assemblage contained stone tools, animal bones, modified bone, and numerous ostrich eggshell beads.

In 2014 the Grassridge Archaeological and Palaeoenvironmental Project (GAPP) started new excavations at the site and re-examined the existing stratigraphy, chronology, and environmental evidence. Researchers used radiocarbon dating, optically stimulated luminescence dating, sediment analyses, and analyses of archaeological materials. They dated a previously unknown Pleistocene occupation between the Middle Stone Age and mid-Holocene occupations. The new chronology distinguishes three main occupations at the site: Late Pleistocene (43,000-28,000 years ago), terminal Pleistocene (13,500-11,600 years ago), and mid-Holocene (7,300-6,800 years ago). Later studies, such as a master’s dissertation, have examined the site's animal remains and environmental context.

== Location ==
Grassridge ‌Rock ‌Shelter ‌is an archaeological site in the Eastern Cape province of South Africa. It is on the interior grasslands, at the base of the Stormberg Mountains it overlooks the upper part of a small valley, facing southeast. The rock shelter is 40 metres wide, 10 metres deep, and has an area of about 225 square metres under the overhang. The site lies within the Sub-Escarpment Grassland Bioregion where dry Cymbopogon-Themeda grassland gives way to Highland Sourveld. The climate ranges from rainfall and warm weather in the summer and drier freezing conditions in the winter.

== Climate and environmental change ==
The site's ‌position ‌in ‌the Stormberg Mountains has made it a valuable site for studying environmental change in southern Africa. Studies based on sediment and faunal remains have been conducted to learn more about the environment during the different occupations of the site. Analysis of phytoliths and other sedimentary indicators suggest substantial environmental changes through time, with a colder and relatively arid climate during the Late Pleistocene and a warmer climate and more diverse vegetation during the mid-Holocene.

Beads found at Grassridge Rockshelter

== Ornaments ==
Ostrich ‌eggshell ‌beads ‌are the most prominent type of ornament in the archaeological record at Grassridge Rockshelter. The first excavation recovered thousands of ostrich eggshell fragments as well as complete beads and broken or unfinished beads. Beads at various stages of completion have been identified and researchers know that bead making also occurred at the site during the Pleistocene and mid-Holocene occupations. When studying the bead sizes and shapes and they found differences between the Pleistocene and mid-Holocene occupations that suggest differences in technique over time. They also examined the shape, use-wear, and surface residues on the beads to learn more about their manufacture, use, and preservation. Other ornaments include perforated gastropod shells, marine shell fragments, and freshwater mussel ornaments. Nassarius shells had to have been brought in from the coast 200 km away. These finds suggest contact between inland and coastal groups, but they do not provide any evidence for specific trade routes. Ochreous material was identified on some of the beads using residue analysis, but the researchers could not determine whether all the traces were the result of intentional coloring, contact with an ochre-covered hide, or contamination from sediments.

== Tools ==
Nearly 10,000 stone artifacts from the Late Pleistocene Middle Stone Age deposits were recovered during the initial 1979 excavation. The majority of these were flakes and blades produced from hornfels. A small percentage of the assemblage consists of lithics such as points and blades with modified edges. The shape has been used by researchers to define the Middle Stone Age occupation at Grassridge . Other stone tools from the Later Stone Age include flakes, scrapers, backed fragments, and cores. The size and shape of the scrapers have helped researchers to identify different making traditions at the site. The techniques used in the terminal Pleistocene are referred to as the Albany/Oakhurst, while the mid-Holocene has tools are from the Wilton culture. These assemblages have assisted researchers in comparing Grassridge to other sites in southern Africa. During the excavations, researchers also found evidence of worked bone and shell, showing that people used animals and other natural resources for objects. The ongoing analysis of these assemblages, with the bead and animal evidence, help increase our understanding of technological practices and changes in shelter usage over time .

== Faunal remains ==
The ‌animal ‌remains ‌recovered from Grassridge provide information about the local environment as well as the resources available to the people who used the shelter. Remains from the terminal Pleistocene and mid-Holocene occupations were analized and a variety of hoofed animals were identified, which corroborates the interpretation of a grassland interspersed with woodland thickets. Water-dependent animals, such as reedbuck, suggest the presence of a water source nearby. The pattern of change in the relative amounts of small mammals and tortoises during the occupation sequence may be indicative of changes in subsistence behaviour, but the relationship between pattern and behaviour is tenuous.

More recent studies have focussed on the faunal analysis of fragmented bones that could not be reliably identified through visual analysis. Using Zooarchaeology by Mass Spectrometry (ZooMS) in combination with stable carbon and nitrogen isotope analysis, a researcher identified 85% of her sample to at least tribal level. Her findings indicate a shift from a cooler, drier grassland environment with high numbers of grazers during the Late Pleistocene to a warmer environment with an increased number of browsers during the mid-Holocene. Her work also reveals the presence of unexpected animals, such as ostrich and blue duiker.
