= Panga ya Saidi =

Archaeological site in Kenya

- location in Kenya
- 3°40′43″S 39°44′9″E
- Location: Kilifi County of Kenya
- Region: Kenya

Panga ya Saidi is an archaeological cave site located in Kilifi County, southeastern Kenya, about 15 km from the Indian Ocean in the Dzitsoni limestone hills. The cave site has rich archaeological deposits dating to the Middle Stone Age, Later Stone Age, and Iron Age. Excavated deposits preserve an unusually long record of human activities, from around 78,000 years ago until around 400 years ago, a chronology supported by radiocarbon dating and optically stimulated luminescence dating. This sequence puts Panga ya Saidi alongside other key sites such as Enkapune ya Muto, Mumba Rockshelter, and Nasera Rockshelter that are important for understanding the Late Pleistocene and the Middle to Later Stone Age transition in eastern Africa.

The archaeological potential of Panga ya Saidi was first noted by Robert Soper and later by Richard Helm. Beginning in 2010, the cave site has been excavated by the Sealinks Project, headed by Nicole Boivin. The interdisciplinary archaeological project is now based at the Max Planck Institute for the Science of Human History, in partnership with the National Museums of Kenya. These investigations have helped to establish the significance of Panga ya Saidi for understanding the Middle to Later Stone Age technological transition and the proliferation of symbolic objects such as bone tools, engraved ochre, and beads in Late Pleistocene eastern Africa. Zooarchaeology and stable isotope analysis have been used to reconstruct Late Pleistocene and Holocene paleoecology and subsistence from animal bone remains. Investigations have also focused on the role of the site in late Holocene agricultural and trading networks along the Swahili coast, with African crops such as pearl millet, nonnative animals such as black rat, marine shell beads, glass beads, and Tana ware pottery documented in the Iron Age deposits. Ancient DNA recovered from a 400-year-old burial indicated that this individual was most closely related to ancient and present-day hunter-gatherers in eastern Africa, including the ancient individual at Mota, Ethiopia.

== Site setting ==
The site is located in Southern Kenya's Nyali Coast region. This area includes the counties of Kilifi, Mombasa, Kwale. This region includes the limestone Dzitsoni Uplands. Thirteen rivers extend across the area, creating floodplains and alluvial valleys. The site's environmental surroundings are part of an overall transition from low coastal plains to coastal uplands to high coastal plains. In the northern part of the region, the low and high coastal plains are separated by a foot plateau. The southern part of the region differs in that the low and high coastal plains are instead divided by a coastal range. This coastal range is defined by steep hills and erosional scarps. In terms of vegetation, the site is situated on the edge of the Arabuko Sokoke Forest, is overlooking the Shale Savannah, and is west of the Lowland Dry Forest on Coral Rag and the Mangrove Thicket on the low coastal plains. The region experiences two rainy seasons. The first short rainy season spans from October to December, and is followed by a long rainy season spanning from April to June.

== Stratigraphy and dating ==
Based on a 3 meter deep excavation of the archaeological site, a sequence of 19 layers were found and divided by three lithographic boundaries into four groups. The oldest group consisted of Layers 19 - 17 (dated to 76,000-73,000 years ago) characterized primarily by reddish-brown clay loams with bone fragments from mollusk shells and mammals, and appears to lack any structures. The unit is interpreted as a period of sporadic human occupation. Layers 16 - 14 (67,000-59,000 years ago) consisted mostly of orange-brown slit-like loam with deposits of ash and bedrock clasts. There is an increased presence of human activity with lithics, bone fragments, and charcoal flakes appearing in Layers 15 & 14. Unit II is interpreted as a floor level, with accumulated wall and roof collapses and evidence of burning. Unit III with layers 13 - 5 (59,000-14,000 years ago) contains heterogenous loam with abundant evidence of human activity and ash, with the presence of hearths, burning, lithics, and floor hollows. The Layer 13/12 boundary at about 51,000 years ago reflects a hiatus between two different occupational phases. The increase of human activity is shown by the concentration of human-occupation byproducts, however occupation is intermittent. Finally, Unit IV, or layers 4 -1 (8000 years ago to 400 years ago), consists of loose and silty loam with deposits of charcoal, bone fragments, marine shells, and lithics. The layers are disturbed, with degradation of the cave walls and floor reflecting intermittent human occupation (including a burial and hearths).

== Middle and Later Stone Age occupations ==
=== Stone tools ===
Lithic technology, or stone tools, form an important part of the Panga ya Saidi archaeological record and have helped archaeologists to understand the Middle Stone Age to Later Stone Age transition at the site. The main raw materials used are quartz, followed by chert, and in rare cases, limestone. Limestone was used for informal knapping techniques. Quartz was preferentially used for bipolar flaking of small cores. More formal tool preparation (to make Levallois tools or prismatic blades) was preferentially done on chert. Chert also more frequently underwent reduction, suggesting it was highly valued and conserved, which may suggest it was relatively more difficult to obtain.

There are important changes over time in the lithic technology sequence at Panga ya Saidi. Large or medium-sized tools made on coarse-grained raw material including limestone, using the Levallois technique, are found in early deposits at the site. These Levallois cores, flakes, and retouched flakes are typical of the Middle Stone Age in eastern Africa. Between 72,000 and 67,000 years ago, archaeologists note a trend over time toward bipolar reduction techniques and smaller and sharper tools, such as prismatic blades, made on fine-grained raw material. Limestone becomes rare, and quartz common. The shift toward smaller tools, a phenomenon known as miniaturization, as well as shifts toward more frequent bipolar reduction and blade technology, are all typical features of the Later Stone Age in eastern Africa. Over time, other forms, such as crescents, also become more common.

However, the archaeologists note that this is not a dramatic transition, since Levallois techniques continue to be used throughout much of the Panga ya Saidi sequence, even after new technologies appear. This suggests that the Middle to Later Stone Age transition cannot be described in simplistic terms or as a single package. The archaeologists conclude that the defining feature of this transition at Panga ya Saidi is miniaturization, rather than specific tool types or reduction techniques.

=== Faunal remains ===
Mostly small bovids (like duiker and suni), suids (warthog and bushpig), and some primates were found in the faunal remains as the basis of subsistence, while marine faunal remains are understood to be mostly utilized symbolically in the material culture (such as marine shell beads) until the Holocene, when they were also used for consumption.

Tropical environments like those found in coastal eastern Africa were deemed to be a sort of refugium for early human populations, due to their comparatively stable environment and the abundance of edible fauna from the exploitation of the closed forests, woodland and grassland environments.

Zooarchaeology and stable isotope analysis show the environments around Panga ya Saidi changed slightly over time. In the earlier layers of the sequence, skeletal remains of small primates and small bovids living in a closed habitat were relatively common. This initially humid forested area transitioned toward a higher concentration of grassland and a decrease in forested area during Marine Isotope Stage (MIS) 3, as seen by an increase in skeletal remains of larger grazing bovids. This was followed by a resurgence in humid, forested land at the Pleistocene to Holocene transition, when small bovids become more common again in the faunal remains. Carbon and oxygen stable isotope analysis concurs with the zooarchaeological evidence, indicating that there were shifts from more wooded ecosystems in the MIS 5 and MIS 4 to open habitats in MIS 3 and a later shift back into wooded, grassland environments in the Holocene. Roberts et al. concluded from their evidence that this heterogeneous environment allowed Homo sapiens to develop novel technologies and material culture.

=== Human remains ===
A deciduous second molar of a child was found in some of the deepest deposits at Panga ya Saidi, located in Layer 18 and dating to about 78,000 years ago (MIS 5). Carbon and oxygen stable isotope analysis indicate reliance on C3 plants. Since this is a deciduous tooth, that dietary signal may reflect the diet of the child's mother if breastfeeding, or it may reflect food given to the child if weaning. The signal of C3 plants is consistent with zooarchaeological evidence showing that the main animals at Panga ya Saidi in the deepest layers were from tropical forested or woodland environments.

Evidence of modern behaviour was found in 2021 when evidence of Africa's earliest intentional burial was found. A 78,000 year old Middle Stone Age grave of a three-year-old child was discovered in Panga ya Saidi cave. Researchers said the child's head appeared to have been laid on a pillow. The body had been laid in a fetal position. However, this alleged burial is tens of thousands of years younger than burials at Skhul and Qafzeh cave, in Israel who belonged to African populations with the same African lithic cultural tradition.

== Iron Age occupations ==
=== Plant remains ===
During the Iron Age, Panga ya Saidi primarily had archaeobotanical evidence for crops such as pearl and finger millet, sorghum and baobab. A direct Accelerator Mass Spectrometry radiocarbon date on a sorghum seed indicates that this crop appeared at Panga ya Saidi by 770–950 CE. The crops present at Panga ya Saidi are African crops, introduced to the coastal region from their areas of origin farther west. Non-African crops such as Asian rice (Oryza sativa), however, were absent at Panga ya Saidi, which may be because the site was not a major trading port along the coast; by contrast, these crops are found at sites contemporaneous with Panga ya Saidi on the islands of Pemba and Zanzibar, such as Tumbe and Unguja Ukuu.

=== Faunal remains ===
The expansion of agro-pastoral and maritime trade networks during the last 1300 years of occupation at the Panga ya Saidi site, supported by coastal faunal and botanical remains, indicate long-term habitation of these coastal sites during the Late Iron Age. As well, evidence from carbon and oxygen stable isotopes and zooarchaeological data show that people hunted African bovids (like those listed above), and that the environment was semi-closed forest during the Iron Age.

Panga ya Saidi contained a high concentration of murid remains, but mainly these were local rodents, and not the nonnative species Asian black rat (Rattus rattus). The rodent remains obtained from Panga ya Saidi were identified using collagen fingerprinting or ZooMS. The majority of the rodent specimens at Panga ya Saidi were found to be local murids, with the only confirmed R. rattus specimen being found relatively near the surface of the site.

=== Human remains ===
The Iron Age burial discovered at Panga ya Saidi was dated to approximately 400 years ago by direct AMS radiocarbon dating. The buried person was an adult male, interred alongside artifacts including marine shell beads, small knapped stone tools, and Tana Tradition potsherds. Evidence from material culture and zooarcheology indicate that he was likely a forager. Further evidence for forager activity stems from ancient DNA analysis indicating that this person was most closely related to other known eastern African foragers in the area, including the individual from Mota Cave, Ethiopia, and present-day Hadza. Stable carbon and oxygen isotope analysis of one of the permanent molars from this individual indicate that he relied on the resources of forest and/or woodland environments, with no indication of reliance on C4 crops (such as pearl millet, found at the site).
