= Kuumbi Cave =

National Historic Site of Tanzania

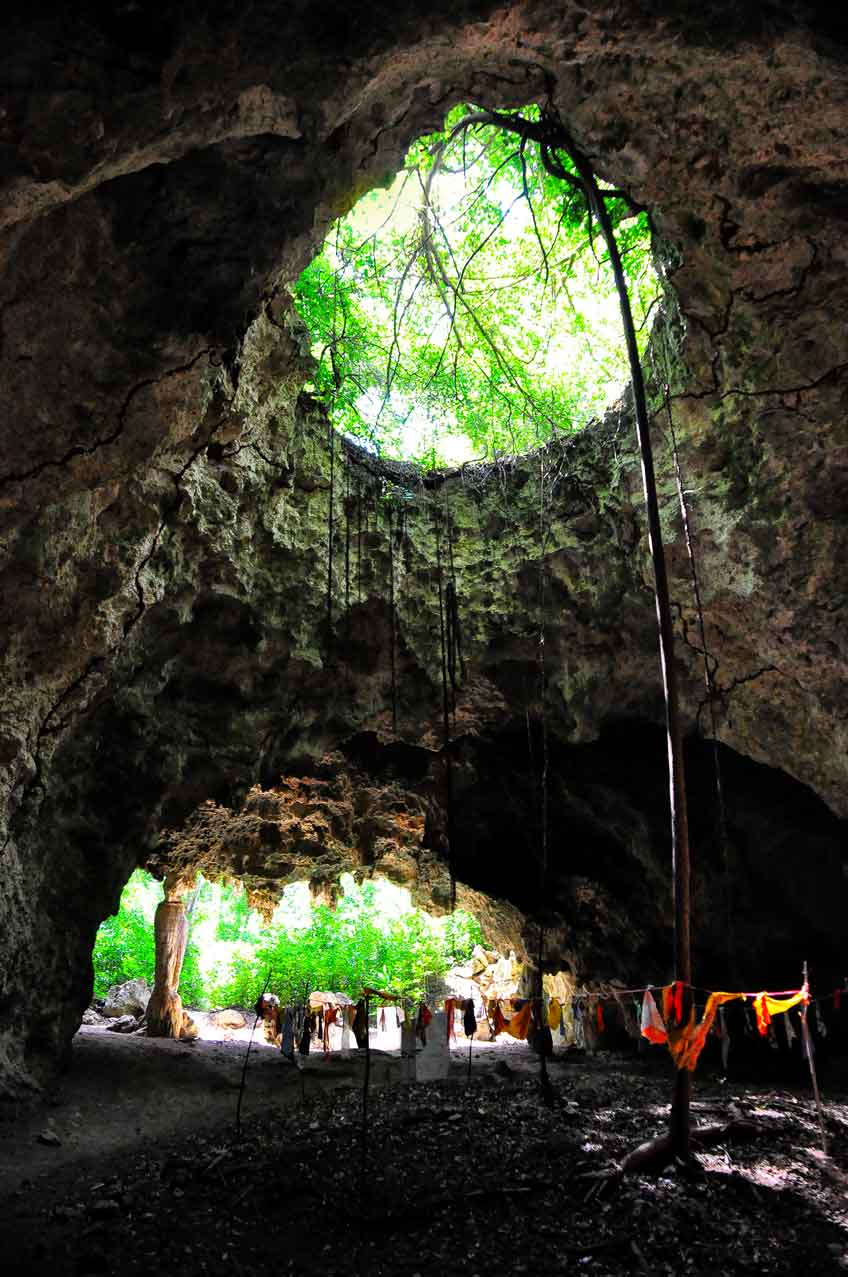
- View of Kuumbi Cave entrance near Jambiani

- Location within Tanzania
- 6°21′40″S 39°32′33″E
- Type: Settlement
- Cultures: Hadimu
- Location: Kusini District, Unguja South Region, Tanzania

Site notes
- Owner: Tanzanian Government
- Management: Antiquities Division, Ministry of Natural Resources and Tourism

National Historic Sites of Tanzania
- Official name: Kuuumbi Caves Site
- Type: Cultural

Kuumbi Cave (Pango la Kuumbi in Swahili) is an archaeological site located in Kusini District, Unguja South Region of Tanzania. It has been important in determining patterns of human occupation since its formation over 20,000 years ago. Unusual lithic and ceramic finds dated within the last 2,000 years make Kuumbi Cave a unique site. Its name in Swahili, Pango la Kuumbi, translates to "Cave of Creation".

== Location ==
Kuumbi Cave is located near the southeastern coast of Unguja Island, which is in the Indian Ocean off the east coast of Africa. The geographical topography of the area indicates that, despite sea level changes, Kuumbi Cave has always been within a few kilometers of the shore for the duration of its human occupation.

== Local population ==
Unguja Island has a population of approximately 900,000 as of the 2012 census. The locals speak kiunguja ("the language of Unguja"), the standard dialect of Swahili, as well as English and other European languages in tourist areas.

=== Protection of Sacred Heritage Places ===
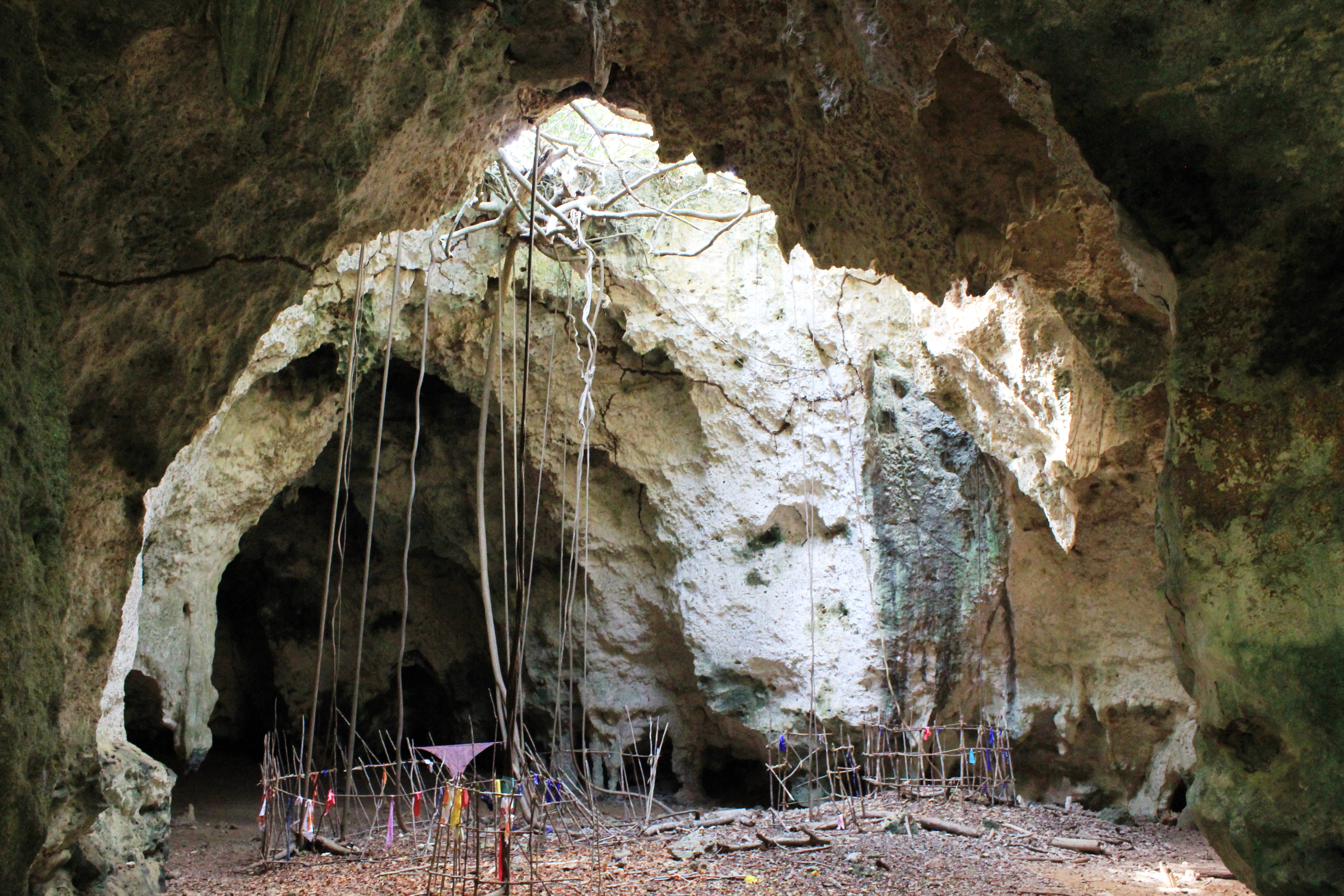
Kuumbi Cave interior

Efforts are being made to preserve cultural heritage at archaeological sites. The cave and surrounding forest are considered sacred by the Hadimu population. Some elderly residents of the nearby town of Jambiani are able to recall their parents or grandparents living in the cave as hunter-gatherers, and locals believe a shetani spirit continues to live in the cave. Archaeologists must obtain permission from both the Revolutionary Government of Zanzibar and the local caretakers to study Kuumbi Cave.

== History ==
=== Formation ===
Sea level changes during the late Quaternary period created large limestone deposits and eroded terraces within said deposits along the seaward coastline. Kuumbi Cave was formed when the ceiling collapsed in on one of those hollow terraces at least 20,000 years ago.

=== Human occupation ===
There are multiple stories of the discovery of the cave by the ancestors of local informants. In one version, a hunting party followed an antelope through the brush into a cave with fresh water, and eventually decided to stay there.

Excavations of Later Stone Age stone tools dating back to at least 22,000 years ago indicate that the island was occupied during the Late Pleistocene. Kuumbi Cave appears to have been abandoned and then later resettled some number of times. There were at least two occupations during the terminal Pleistocene and Holocene, and another more recent reoccupation by 600 A.D.

During periods of human occupation on the island, large mammal populations have fallen or completely disappeared, though it is unclear if this is attributable to anthropogenic or natural causes. Small bovids, hyrax, giant pouched rats, monkeys, and giant snails appear to have been a constant terrestrial food source in the region. Zebras and larger bovids disappeared early on in the anthropogenic record.

== Archaeological finds ==
Gaps in the archaeological record suggest that humans did not continually occupy Kuumbi Cave since its first discovery. The cave's stratigraphy is mixed, making it difficult to date certain archaeological finds. Rainwater erodes away old surfaces and carries in new sediment and foreign artifacts. Additionally, rodent burrows and tree roots contribute to the redistribution of stratigraphic layers.

=== Lithics ===
Different types of stones found include silicified limestone, quartz flakes, and coral limestone. Early investigations concluded that coral limestone was made into tools; however, reanalysis found that the material would have been poorly suited for any kind of tool use. The quartz flakes were created via the bipolar technique, in which an anvil is used. Silicified limestone flakes which did not originate in the cave were created via a free-handed technique which was unusual in the region at the time.

=== Human remains ===
A human skeleton was found under what appears to be a stone cairn. Associated charcoal was dated to over 12,000 years ago.

=== Animal remains ===
Charcoal associated with cattle, goat, dog, and chicken remains was dated to almost 6,000 years ago. However, later investigations did not find such early evidence for domestic animals at the site.

==== Marine animals ====
The most abundant marine animal remains found so far are shells, though some remains of fish, turtle carapace, sea sponge, and sea urchin are also present. Marine shells dated back to 19,000 years ago signify early human occupation. Beads made from marine shells are worn down from use and may have been sewn onto fabric.

==== Escargotières ====
These 'snail middens' are large deposits of thousands of shells of giant African land snails. The volume of shells, the proportion of juvenile to adult shells, and evidence of shell burning all suggest human predation, but this is not certain.

==== Bone tools ====
Some bone projectile points show 'retrieval cut marks' from where they were cut out from inside an animal carcass. One projectile point has deliberate horizontal cut marks; the speculated purposes are ownership identification, increased adhesion to other components of the projectile, or increased poison adhesion. This poison would have been required if the point was intended for use in hunting larger animals, as it is not large enough to mortally wound one on its own. It is also possible that these points were used for spearfishing.

An awl made from animal bone shows wear from piercing soft materials and suggests a leather working industry at Kuumbi Cave.

A bone tube was found with five notches that appear to be decorative. Proposed functions for similar bone tubes include: flutes, tobacco pipes, straws, medicine containers, incense containers, poison containers, ornaments, and handles for tools.

=== Ceramics ===
Tana Tradition/Triangular Incised Ware ceramic sherds found in Kuumbi Cave are decorated with a local variation on the traditional Tana ornamentation style.

== See also ==
- National Historic Sites in Tanzania
