= Nasera Rockshelter =

Archaeological site in Tanzania

Nasera
- Site location in Tanzania
- 2°41′48″S 35°19′29″E
- Type: Settlement
- Location: Ngorongoro District, Arusha Region, Tanzania
- Region: Eastern Africa

Site notes
- Excavation dates: 1932, 1975 & 1976
- Archaeologists: Louis Leakey & Michael Mehlman
- Condition: Excavated
- Owner: Tanzanian Government
- Management: Antiquities Division, Ministry of Natural Resources and Tourism
- Public access: Yes

National Historic Sites of Tanzania
- Official name: Nasera Rockshelter

Nasera Rockshelter is an archaeological site located in the Ngorongoro Conservation Area within Ngorongoro District of Arusha Region in northern Tanzania, and it has evidence of Middle Stone Age and Later Stone Age occupations in the Late Pleistocene to early Holocene, and ceramic-bearing Holocene occupations attributed to Kansyore, Nderit, and Savanna Pastoral Neolithic traditions.

The site was first excavated by Louis Leakey in 1932. A second series of excavations by Michael Mehlman in 1975 and 1976 led to the first comprehensive published study of the shelter, its stratigraphy and chronology (supported by radiocarbon dates), and its abundant material culture, including stone tools, faunal remains, and pottery. Recent work has sought to better understand chronology, lithic technology, mobility and demography, and site formation processes at Nasera Rockshelter.

Nasera Rockshelter is considered a key site in eastern Africa for understanding the Middle Stone Age to Later Stone Age transition, and also for the study of the spread of livestock herding during the Pastoral Neolithic. Its chronology and archaeological sequence have been compared to those of other key sites in the region such as Mumba Rockshelter, Kisese II Rockshelter, Panga ya Saidi, and Enkapune ya Muto.
