= Slon =

Slon may refer to:

- Elephant in many Slavic languages
- Slon, a village in Cerașu Commune, Prahova County, Romania
- Slon.ru, a Russian magazine
- Russian abbreviation of the Solovki prison camp (Соловецкий лагерь особого назначения)
- Slon (album) an album by the Chicago Underground Trio
- Slon (aircraft)

== People with the surname ==
- Claudio Slon (1943–2002), Brazilian jazz drummer
- Krzysztof Słoń (born 1964), Polish politician
- Sidney Slon (1910–1995), American radio script writer
- Viviane Slon, paleogeneticist
