= Viviane Slon =

Paleogeneticist

- Education: Tel Aviv University; Max Planck Institute for Evolutionary Anthropology
- Known for: Paleogenetics; Denny
- Awards: Nature's 10 (2018)
- Scientific career
- Fields: Ancient DNA; Human evolution Paleoanthropology
- Workplaces: Max Planck Institute for Evolutionary Anthropology
- Doctoral advisor: Svante Pääbo

Viviane Slon is a paleogeneticist at the Max Planck Institute for Evolutionary Anthropology. She identified that a teenage girl born 90,000 years ago had both Neanderthal and Denisovan parents. She was selected as one of Nature's 10 in 2018.

== Early life and education ==
Slon completed her doctoral studies at the Max Planck Institute for Evolutionary Anthropology. She won the 2017 Dan David Prize. She worked at the Sackler Faculty of Medicine at Tel Aviv University on the earliest human fossils outside Africa. She studied the Qafzeh 9 Skull, looking at developmental malocclusions.

== Research and career ==
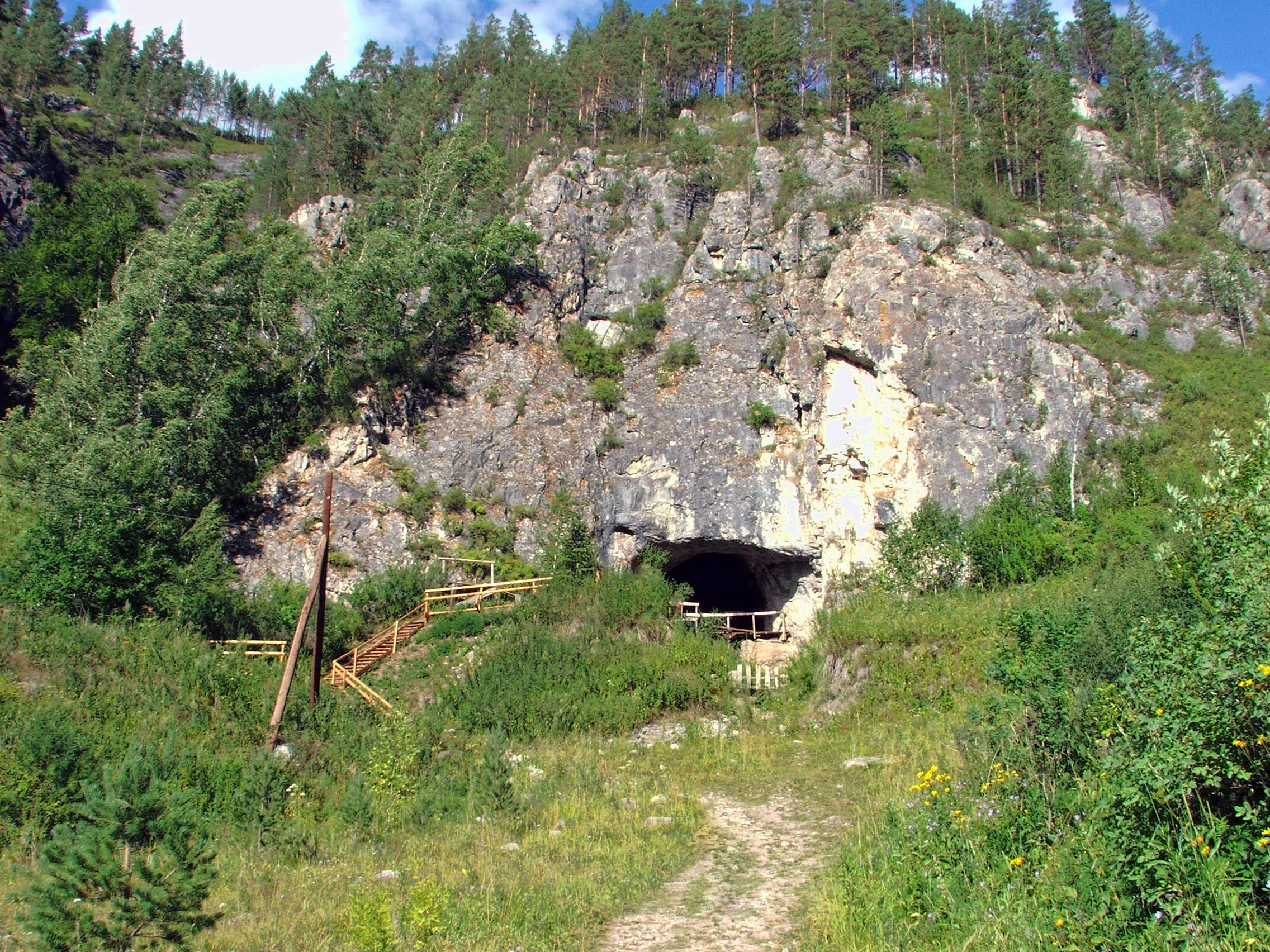
Denisova Cave in 2008

In 2018 Slon was appointed a postdoctoral researcher working on neanderthals at the Max Planck Institute for Evolutionary Anthropology. She develops techniques to remove hominin DNA from sediments. Her doctoral supervisor Svante Pääbo decoded the Denisovan gene. Slon visited the Denisova Cave during a symposium, where over one thousand bones are excavated a year.

As her first project, Slon reported the DNA from the tooth of the fourth Denisova individual ever found on earth. She also co-led a team that found Denisovan DNA in excavated dirt as an alternative to finding rare hominin bones.

In 2018, Slon and her colleagues published the genome of Denny, a hybrid hominin. DNA was extracted from a hominin bone found in a Middle Pleistocene layer. Using genetic analysis and radiocarbon dating, the hominin was identified as a girl born more than 50,000 years ago to a Neanderthal mother and a Denisovan father. The work was covered in BBC News, National Geographic, EurekAlert!, The Atlantic and Archaeology magazine.

Slon was selected as one of Nature's 10 in 2018.
