= Michael Shunkov =

Russian archaeologist

Michael V. Shunkov (born 24 May 1953) is a Russian archaeologist and member of the Russian Academy of Science working at Novosibirsk State University. Shunkov was one of the archaeologists behind the find of a fossilized finger-bone excavated in the Siberian Denisova Cave in the Altai Mountains in 2008 leading up to the 2010 discovery of the Denisova human.
