= Denisova Cave =

Cave and archaeological site in Russia

- Денисова пещера (Russian)
- Аю-Таш
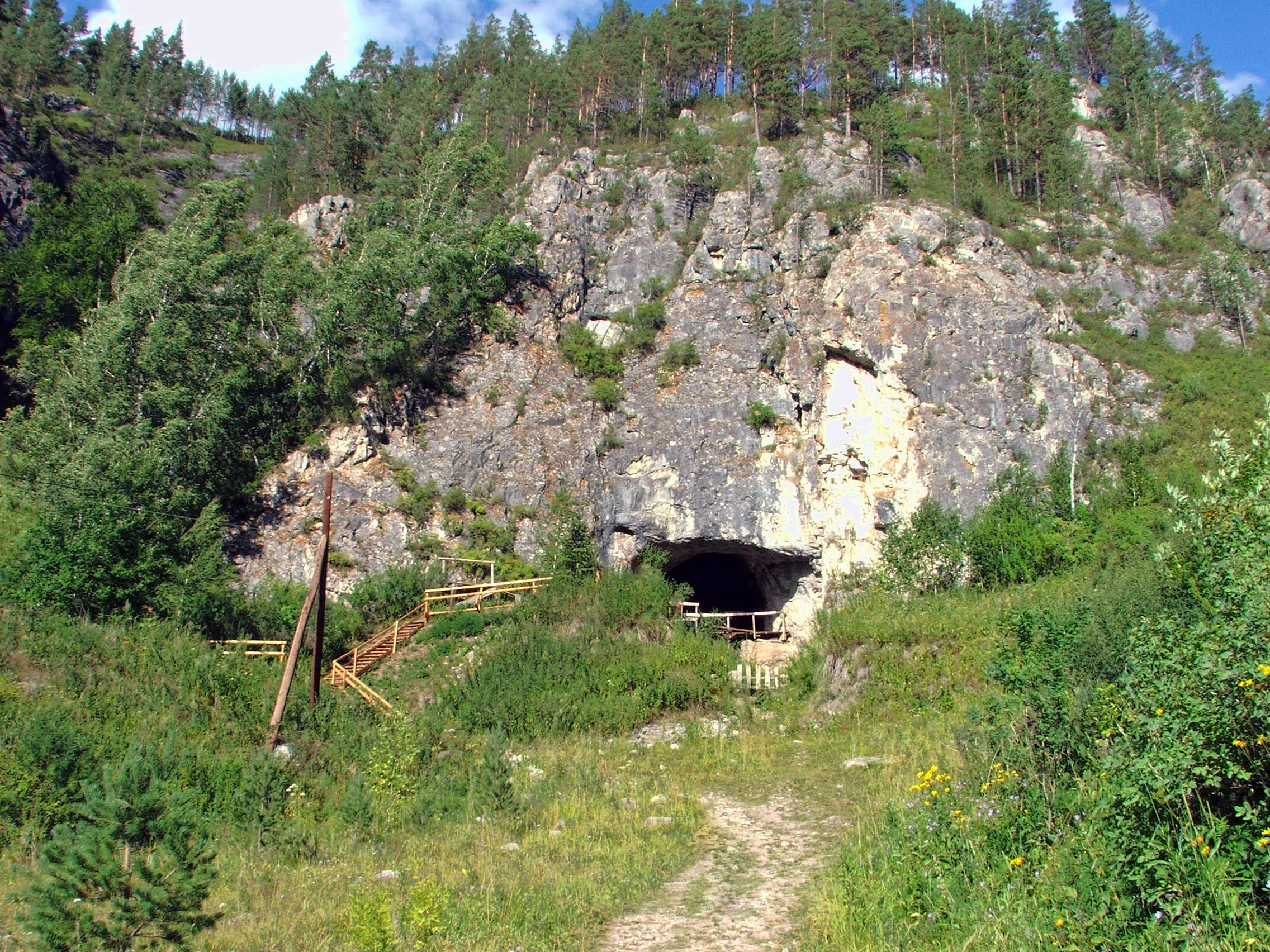
- Denisova Cave in 2008

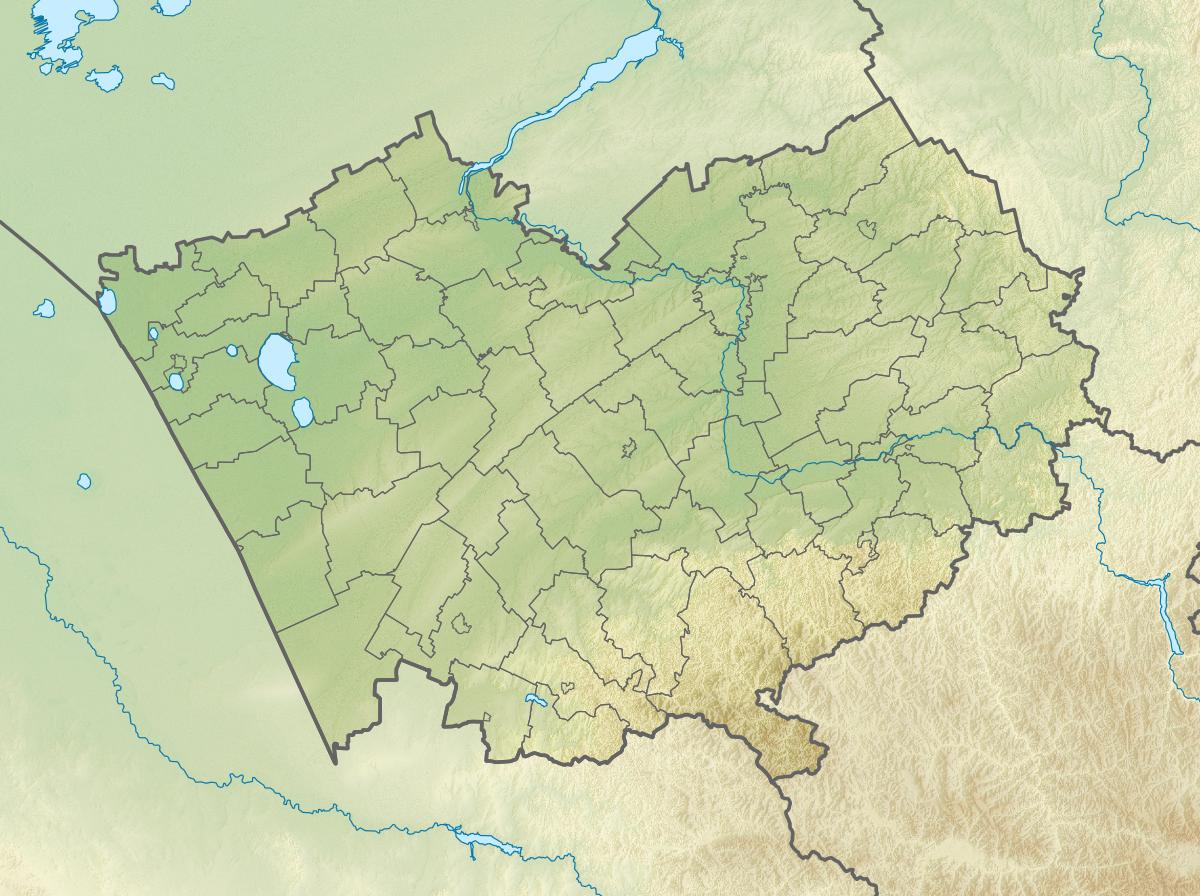
- Location in Russia Denisova Cave (Altai Krai) Denisova Cave (Russia)
- Interactive map of Denisova Cave
- 51°23′51″N 84°40′34″E
- Type: limestone, karst
- Periods: Paleolithic 30,000 to 48,000 years ago
- Cultures: Denisovans, Neanderthals, Homo sapiens sapiens
- Location: Soloneshensky District, Altai Krai
- Region: Siberian Federal District, Russia

Site notes
- Elevation: 700 m (2,300 ft)
- Area: 270 m^{2} (2,900 sq ft)

Denisova Cave (Russian: Денисова пещера, romanized: Denísova peshchéra, lit. 'the cave of Denis') is a cave in the Bashelaksky Range of the Altai Mountains in Siberia, Russia.

It is widely known for having provided items of great paleoarchaeological and paleontological interest. In particular, the 2008 discovery of bone fragments that in 2010 were conclusively established as belonging to a separate early human species – the Denisova hominin – which is named after the cave. Other items included artifacts dated to around 40,000 BP. Remains of a 32,000-year-old prehistoric species of horse have also been found in the cave.

The cave is located in a region thought to have been inhabited concurrently in the past by Neanderthals and by modern humans. A bone needle dated to 50,000 years ago was discovered at the archaeological site in 2016 and has been described as the most ancient needle known (though another possible needle dates to about 10,000 years earlier from South Africa from c. 61,000 years ago).

Denisovans, Neanderthals and related hybrids may have inhabited the Denisova Cave for extended periods, but perhaps not at the same time. The attribution of the needle and certain other artifacts at the cave, whether to Homo sapiens or to the Denisova hominin is uncertain.

The "mystery population" of Homo colloquially referred to as "Denisovans" was for a time also sometimes referred to by the scientific name Homo denisova after the cave, until June 2025, when Denisovans were confirmed to be Homo longi, making H. denisova a junior synonym.

== Description ==
Located in Altai Krai, near the border with Altai Republic, both in Russia, the cave is near the village of Chyorny Anuy (Чёрный Ануй), and some 150 km (93 mi) south of Barnaul, the regional capital. The cave, which is approximately 28 m (92 ft) above the right bank of the Anuy River (a left tributary of the Ob), has formed in upper Silurian limestone and contains a floor area of about 270 m^{2} (2,900 sq ft). The cave is composed of three galleries. The central chamber, the Main Gallery, contains a floor of 9 m × 11 m (30 ft × 36 ft) with side galleries, the East Gallery and the South Gallery. It has been described both as a karst cave and as a sandstone cave.

Cave sediments are rich with remnants of animals, including extinct ones. Remains of 27 species of large and medium-sized mammals have been found, (such as cave hyena, cave lion, etc.) and 39 species of small mammals, as well as remnants of reptiles, 50 bird species and other vertebrates. Pollen in the cave sediments is used for palaeoclimatological research.

== History ==
In the 18th century, the cave was inhabited by an Old Believer hermit, Dyonisiy (Denis), and was named after him.

In the 1970s, Russian scientists discovered paleoarcheological remains in the cave that led to further explorations. So far, 22 strata have been identified, with archeological artifacts that cover the time from Dyonisiy back to about 125,000–180,000 years ago. The dating of the strata was accomplished by the use of thermoluminescence dating of sediments, or, in some cases, radiocarbon dating on charcoal.

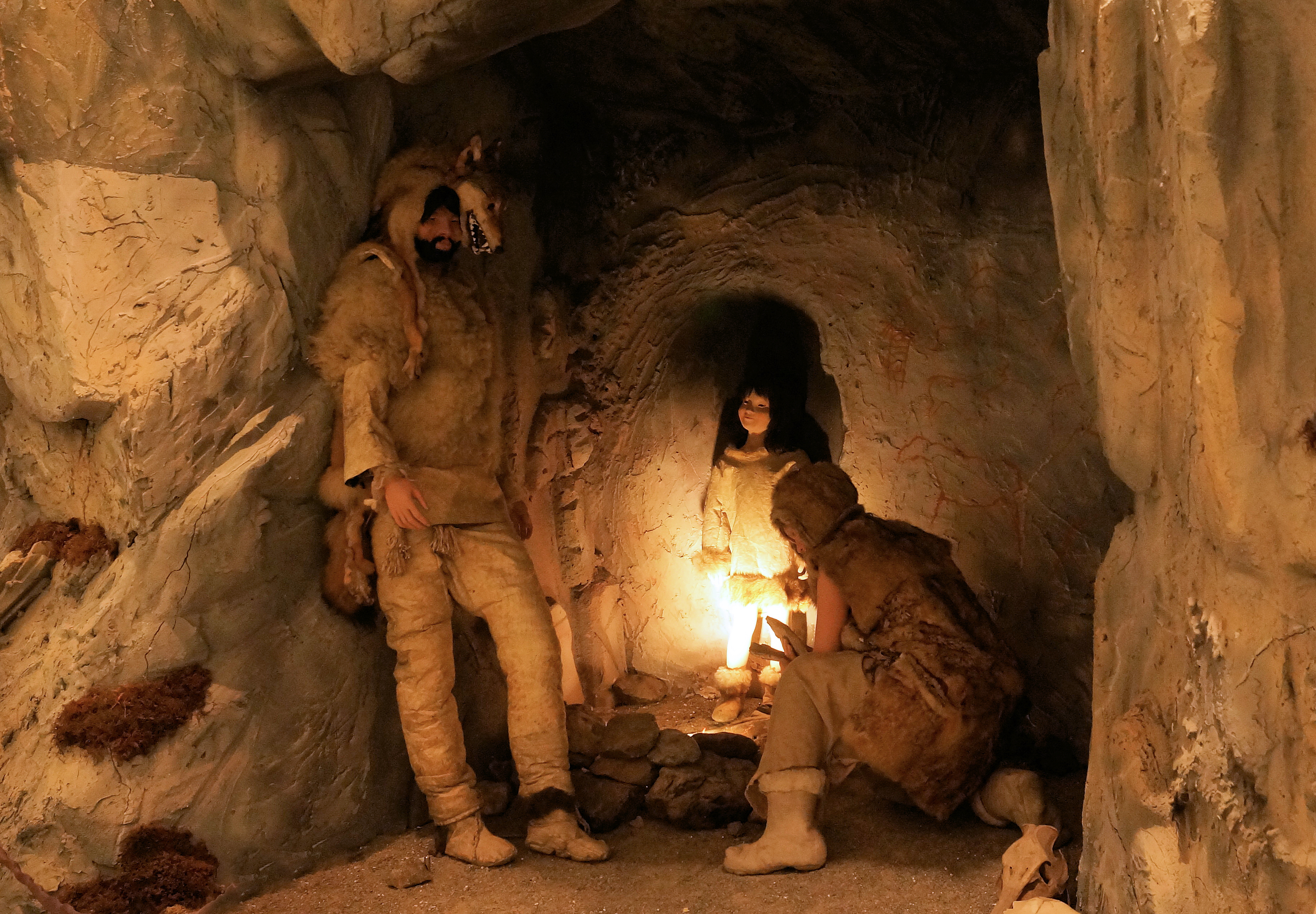
Reconstruction of Altaic cave site, 150.000-10.000 BCE. National Museum of the Altai Republic

Among the archeological artifacts are Mousterian- and Levallois-style tools attributed to Neanderthals. Beside tools, researchers found decorative objects of bone, mammoth tusk, animal teeth, ostrich egg shell, fragments of a stone bracelet made of drilled, worked, and polished dark green chlorite, and pendants. A seven-centimetre (2.8 in) sewing needle made from bird bone, estimated to be around 50,000 years-old, was found in Denisova Cave. The cave also contains stone tools and bone artifacts made by modern humans, and Pääbo commented: "The one place where we are sure all three human forms have lived at one time or another is here in Denisova Cave."

Denisovans, Neanderthals and related hybrids, may have inhabited the Denisova Cave over thousands of years, but it is unclear whether they ever shared the cave.

In 2019, a team of archaeologists from the Russian Academy of Sciences' Institute of Archaeology and Ethnography in Novosibirsk discovered a 45,000-year-old cave lion statue made from a woolly mammoth tusk, according to The Siberian Times. This 42 mm long, 8 mm thick and 11 mm high figurine was unearthed in the eleventh layer of the southern gallery of Denisova Cave. According to Siberian archeologists, this statue made by Upper Palaeolithic artist might be the oldest animal figurine in the world. The lion's hind legs, groin, back and belly are covered with eighteen rows of notch ornaments and its head is missing. On the right side of the lion there are two extra rows with four notches.

== Archaeogenetics ==
The average annual temperature of the cave remains at 0 °C (32 °F), which has contributed to the preservation of archaic DNA among the remains discovered.

=== Denisova hominin ===
Scientists from the Russian Academy of Sciences' Institute of Archaeology and Ethnography in Novosibirsk have investigated the cave. Among the artifacts which had been left about 30,000 to 48,000 years ago (strata 9–11), bones were identified. One of these bones was a piece of phalanx of a child found in layer 11.2 of the East Gallery. The fossil element was analyzed by Svante Pääbo and coworkers from the Max Planck Institute for Evolutionary Anthropology in Leipzig; its mitochondrial DNA revealed a structure that differs from known human patterns and has been ascribed to "Denisova hominin". Pääbo and his co-workers first intended to classify the Denisovans as a separate species but changed their minds prior to publication of the results. Further analysis revealed the Denisovans were related to the Neanderthals and interbred with the ancestors of modern Melanesians.

=== Neanderthal remains: the Altai Neanderthal ===
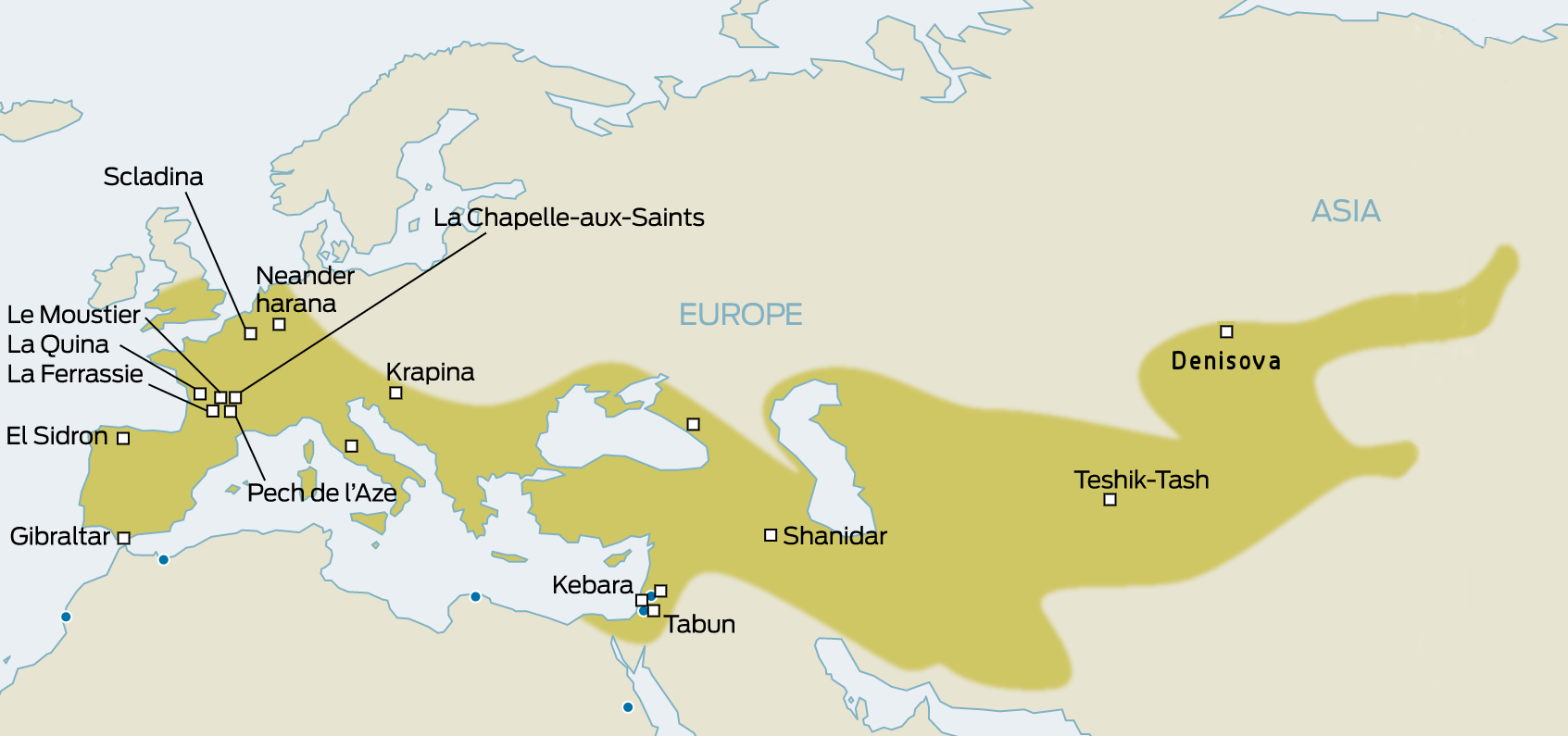
Neanderthal distribution.

In 2010, a toe bone was discovered in the cave, in layer 11.4 of the East Gallery, and therefore contemporary with the Denisovan finger bone. Preliminary characterization of the bone's mitochondrial DNA suggested it belonged to a Neanderthal, not a Denisovan. Later analysis confirmed the toe bone as coming from a Neanderthal. The first high-coverage genome of Neanderthals was taken from this toe bone.

This Neanderthal is referred to as the Altai Neanderthal. The Altai Neanderthal is estimated to be around 120,000 years old. Other Neanderthals for which nuclear DNA has been recovered are all genetically closer to each other than to the Altai Neanderthal. Modern humans and Ust'-Ishim man share more alleles with all other Neanderthals than with the Altai Neanderthal, which shows that the introgression event from Neanderthals into humans likely took place after the split of the lineage of the Altai Neanderthal from that of other Neanderthals.

=== Denisova 11: a first-generation Neanderthal and Denisovan hybrid ===
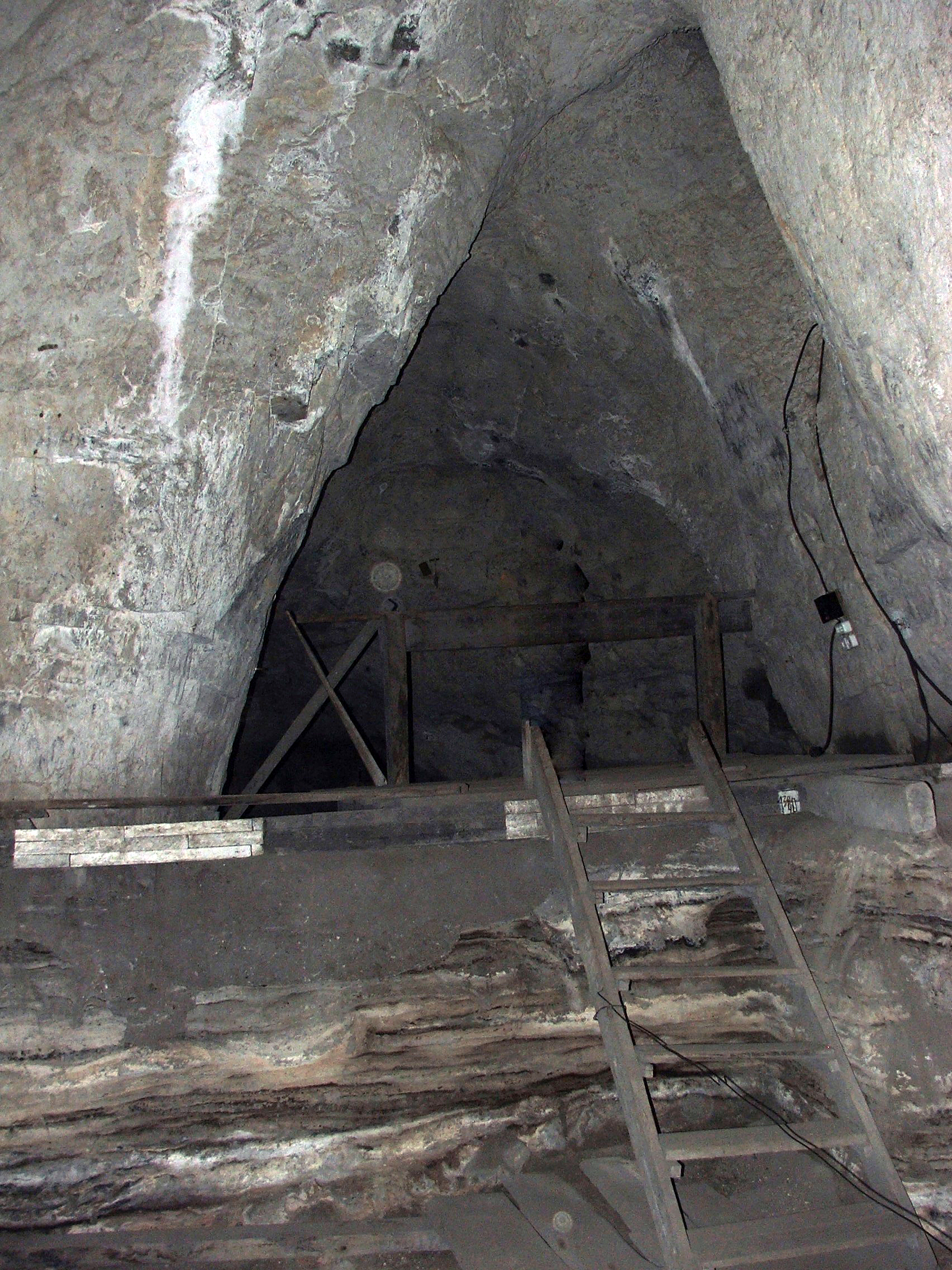
The interior of the cave, 2008

The use of collagen peptide mass fingerprinting of ancient bone samples, called Zooarchaeology by Mass Spectrometry (ZooMS), for species identification allowed the sorting of 2,315 unidentified bone fragments from 2012 or 2014 excavation. One sample, DC1227 (Denisova 11), taken from layer 12 of the East Gallery, carried human traits. This was the first time that this technique was used to successfully identify the presence of an extinct hominid. DC1227 was a bone fragment weighing 1.68 g (0.059 oz), measuring in with a maximum length of 24.7 mm (0.97 in) and maximum width of 8.39 mm (0.330 in). Further analysis showed the bone fragment to have Neanderthal mitochondrial DNA (mtDNA).

Whole genome sequencing and other characterization of Denisova 11 to 2.6-fold coverage showed this specimen belonged to a female at least thirteen years old at the time of death. Denisova 11 was found to be the hybrid progeny of a Neanderthal mother and a Denisovan father. Comparing the entire genome against all archaic hominin genomes on record, Denisova 11 shares the most genetic affinity with Denisova 3, indicating that her Denisovan father is more closely related to Denisova 3 than her mother was to any of the sequenced Neanderthals. Like Denisova 3, this father carries some introgressed Neanderthal DNA from an admixture event far in the past, estimated at more than 300 generations earlier, and similar in sequence to the Altai Neanderthal genome. However, the mother of Denisova 11 was genetically closer to Neanderthal specimen Vindija 33.19 from Vindija Cave in Croatia and to other sequenced Neanderthal individuals than to the Altai Neanderthal. This suggests a migration or population turnover involving the Neanderthal populations of the region surrounding the Denisova cave.

=== DNA from soil ===
Sequencing of DNA from soil samples taken from Denisova Cave showed the presence of Neanderthal and Denisovan mtDNA from several samples, as well as the DNA of several animals. Neanderthal mtDNA was present in soil samples from layer 15 of the Main Gallery, a layer associated with Paleolithic artifacts where no Neanderthal fossils have been found. Neanderthal and Denisovan mtDNA were present in samples from layers 14 and 15, respectively, from the East Gallery, lower than any previous fossil finds.

=== Equus ovodovi ===
MtDNA has also been recovered from an equine fossil, dating to around 32,000 years ago, taken from Denisova Cave. The equid fossil was identified as coming from Equus ovodovi an extinct species first described based on a 40,000 year old fossil taken from Proskuryakova Cave in Khakassia, Russia. The mtDNA of the Denisova sample shows close affinity for that taken from Proskuryakova Cave. DNA analysis places Equus ovodovi as a phylogenetically basal group for non-caballine horses, with closer genetic affinities with zebras and asses.

=== Ancient North Eurasian woman ===
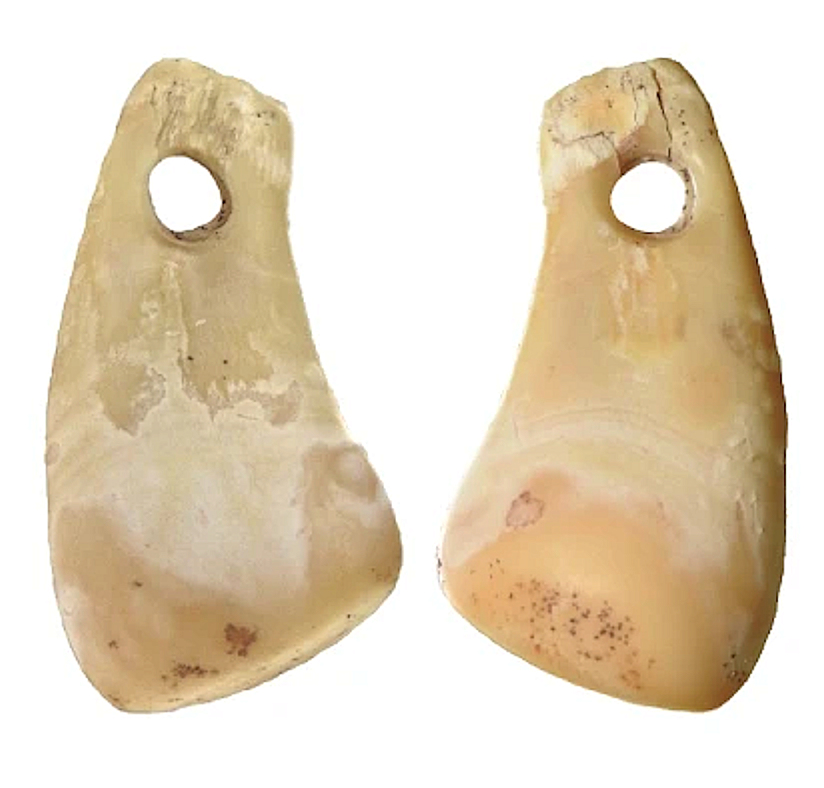
Deer tooth pendant of an ANE woman, from Denisova Cave, dated circa 24,700 years BP.

A deer tooth pendant impregnated with the genetic material of an Ancient North Eurasian (ANE) woman was found in the Denisova Cave, and dated to circa 24,700 years before present. The woman was found to be closely related to Mal'ta and Afontova Gora specimens found further east.

== Fossils ==
So far, the fossils of seven distinct individuals from Denisova Cave have been identified through their DNA. Four of the individuals, Denisova 2, Denisova 3, Denisova 4, Denisova 8, and Denisova 25 are classified as Denisovans. Denisova 2 and Denisova 3 are young females, while Denisova 4 and Denisova 8 are adult males. mtDNA analysis of the Denisovan individuals suggests that Denisova 2 is the oldest, followed by Denisova 8, while Denisova 3 and Denisova 4 are roughly contemporaneous. Denisova 25 is estimated to be from 200ka.

One of the individuals, the Altai Neanderthal, is a Neanderthal woman. Before its DNA was sequenced, the Altai Neanderthal had been given the provisional name of Denisova 5. In 2018, Denisova 11 was identified as a Neanderthal/Denisova hybrid, based on whole genome sequencing and comparisons.

During DNA sequencing, Denisova 2, Denisova 4 and Denisova 8 yielded low-coverage genomes, while Denisova 3, Denisova 25, and the Altai Neanderthal yielded high-coverage genomes.

| Name | Element | Layer | Location | Type | Age | Sex | Discovery | First public. | Image | Notes |
|---|---|---|---|---|---|---|---|---|---|---|
| Denisova 2 | deciduous lower molar | 22.1 | Main Gallery | Denisovan | >100 ka | Female | 1984 | | | |
| Denisova 3 or X Woman | finger phalanx | 11.2 | East Gallery | Denisovan | 30–50 ka | Female | 2008; Team of Michael Shunkov | Johannes Krause, et al. | Replica of the phalanx. It was destroyed to investigate the mtDNA. | Cut in two, one piece partially destroyed to investigate the mtDNA. |
| Denisova 4 | upper molar | 11.1 | South Gallery | Denisovan | 30–50 ka | Male | 2000 | | Replica of the molar of Denisova. Part of the roots was destroyed to study the mtDNA. Their size and shape indicate it is neither Neanderthal nor H. sapiens. | |
| Altai Neanderthal or Denisova 5 | proximal toe phalanx | 11.4 | East Gallery | Neanderthal | 30–50 ka (disputed) | Female | 2010 | M.B. Mednikova (2011) | | Molecular clock analysis of mtDNA suggested this specimen instead dates to ~120 ka. |
| Denisova 8 | upper molar | 11.4–12 | East Gallery | Denisovan | | Male | | | | |
| Denisova 11 | long bone fragment | 12 | East Gallery | Neanderthal/Denisovan hybrid | ~90 ka | Female | 2014 | Samantha Brown, et al. (2016) | | |
| Denisova 25 | molar | | | Denisovan | ~200 ka | Male | 2024 | 2024 | | |

The cave also preserves remains of woolly mammoth, woolly rhinoceros, wild horse, Equus ovodovi, Irish elk, Siberian roe deer, red deer, moose, reindeer, wild yak, steppe wisent, snow leopard, Eurasian cave lion, Eurasian lynx, manul, cave hyena, steppe fox, red fox, grey wolf, dhole, brown bear, Pleistocene small cave bear, wolverine, kolonok, least weasel, pale weasel, steppe polecat, stoat, sable, Eurasian beaver, and Altai marmot.

A 2026 study recovered ancient genomes from 14 bone fragments from the cave that belonged to a previously unidentified extinct bovine lineage, provisionally called "Yak X". The researchers estimated that this lineage diverged from the ancestors of modern yaks about 400,000 years ago.
