= Bahi Rock-Art Sites =

- Location within Tanzania
- 05°57′10″S 35°18′43″E
- Type: Cultural
- Location: Bahi District, Dodoma Region, Tanzania

Site notes
- Governing body: Antiquities Division, Ministry of Natural Resources and Tourism

National Historic Sites of Tanzania
- Official name: Bahi Rock-Art Site

The Bahi Rock-Art Sites or Bahi rock paintings are rock art located at three sites in the Dodoma region of Tanzania. These white paintings are believed to be products of the Wamia people, who occupied the region before the Wagogo people (the current residents). The paintings, which depict cattle, human figures, stools, gourds, a bird, and an arrow, among other symbols, were supposedly executed during important occasions such as funerals. The Wagogo people, though not fully aware of the original significance of the paintings to the Wamia, have continued to use the sites as sacred locations for rain-making ceremonies. The Bahi paintings are estimated to be at least 340 years old based on the genealogy of the Bahi chief in 1929, which revealed the estimated time of his ancestor Kimanchambogo's arrival in the area. The white painting method is generally associated with Bantu-speaking farming populations.

== See also ==
- Kondoa Rock-Art Sites
- National Historic Sites in Tanzania
