= Pontus Skoglund =

Swedish population geneticist (born 1984)

Pontus Skoglund (born 3 March 1984) is a Swedish population geneticist, currently at the Francis Crick Institute and formerly at Harvard Medical School.

Skoglund studies ancient DNA to verify human history, mostly about how humans populated Earth. He found proof that the first Polynesians came from East Asia, along with another study that found genetic evidence of two founding populations of the Americas.
