= Tana ware =

African prehistoric pottery

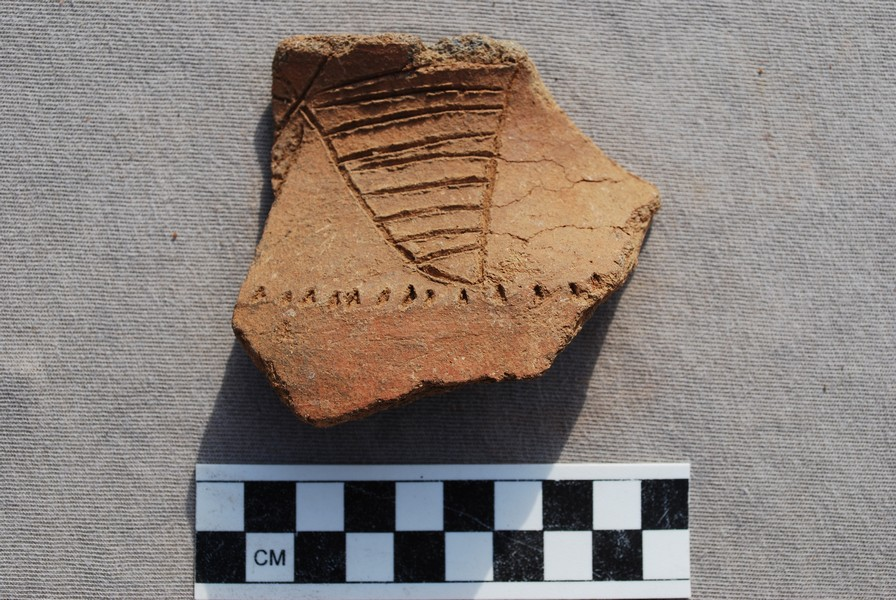
Example of tana ware from Manda, Kenya, featuring filled standing triangles and fingernail impressions.

Tana ware (also called Tana Tradition pottery or Triangular-Incised Ware) refers to a type of prehistoric pottery prominent in East Africa that features a variety of designs, including triangular incised lines and single rows of dots. The presence of this pottery is largely regarded as one of the best indicators for early Swahili settlement. This pottery tradition falls chronologically during the Iron Age in East Africa, during the late first millennium AD and spanning several hundred years. The name Tana ware was given because the early discoveries of these types of pottery were along the Tana River in present day Kenya.

== Name Variants ==
This pottery tradition has been referred to as Tana Ware/Tradition, Triangular-Incised Ware, and kitchen ware by different scholars. Although "Tana Ware" is the most commonly used name today, it has been subject to criticism, and so have the names "Triangular-Incised Ware" and "kitchen ware". The term "Tana Ware" has been criticized for only describing a narrow region of the overall geographic distribution of this pottery, the term "Triangular-Incised Ware" for only indicating one specific decorative motif of this pottery group, and the term "kitchen ware" for being derogatory and not functionally accurate. Currently in the archaeological literature, the term "Tana Ware" is the most frequently used, but "Triangular-Incised Ware" is still present in some publications.

Location of the Tana River, which inspired the name for this pottery tradition.

== Geographical Distribution ==
Tana Ware has been found at many East African archaeological sites over the course of several decades. The geographic distribution of this pottery tradition is widespread, covering the East African coast from Kenya in the north to Mozambique in the south, as well as the central hinterland inland. Archaeological sites that have procured Tana Ware include Kuumbi Cave, Zanzibar; Chibuene, Mozambique; Manda, Kenya; Dakawa, Tanzania; and many others.

== Form and Decorative Motifs ==
There are different variants of Tana Ware evident from archaeological excavation. Formally, there are five main varieties: necked jars, globular jars, open bowls, closed bowls, and carinated bowls. Across several sites studied, necked jars were found to be the most common form of Tana Ware. In addition to form variety, there are over 30 decorative motifs found among Tana Ware pottery. These motifs include triangular incises, drawing back to one of the names of this pottery style (Triangle Incised Ware), fingernail pinches, parallel horizontal lines, shell edge punctuates, cross hatching on rim, and many others. These decoration motifs vary among pottery found from site to site, with different sites having different popular motifs. At Dakawa, for example, filled standing triangles were the dominant motif, whereas Manda saw a larger variety in motifs with filled pending triangles being only slightly more dominant than the other motifs. As a whole, the most common decorative motif featured below the neck of the vessel was a single row of punctuates.

== Development of Tana Ware ==
Tana Ware is widely accepted by scholars to primarily appear in the archaeological record from the late first millennium AD, with varying narrower time spans, such as one publication identifying the time frame 600 AD-900AD. Within the field, there are debates about how Tana Ware came to be and evolved into the defined tradition as described above. One hypothesis is that Tana Ware evolved from Early Iron Ware pottery in a continuous fashion. Another conflicting hypothesis is that Tana Ware did not evolve from Kwale nor Early Iron Age pottery, but it possibly evolved from Pastoral Neolithic peoples in the region. Subsequent other hypotheses surrounding the development of Tana Ware suggest that Tana Ware began to replace Kwale ware in the 5th and 6th centuries AD in the Usambara region, or that the pottery tradition was manufactured by recent Northeast Coastal Bantu migrants to the Swahili coast.
