= Late Stone Age =

Period in African prehistory

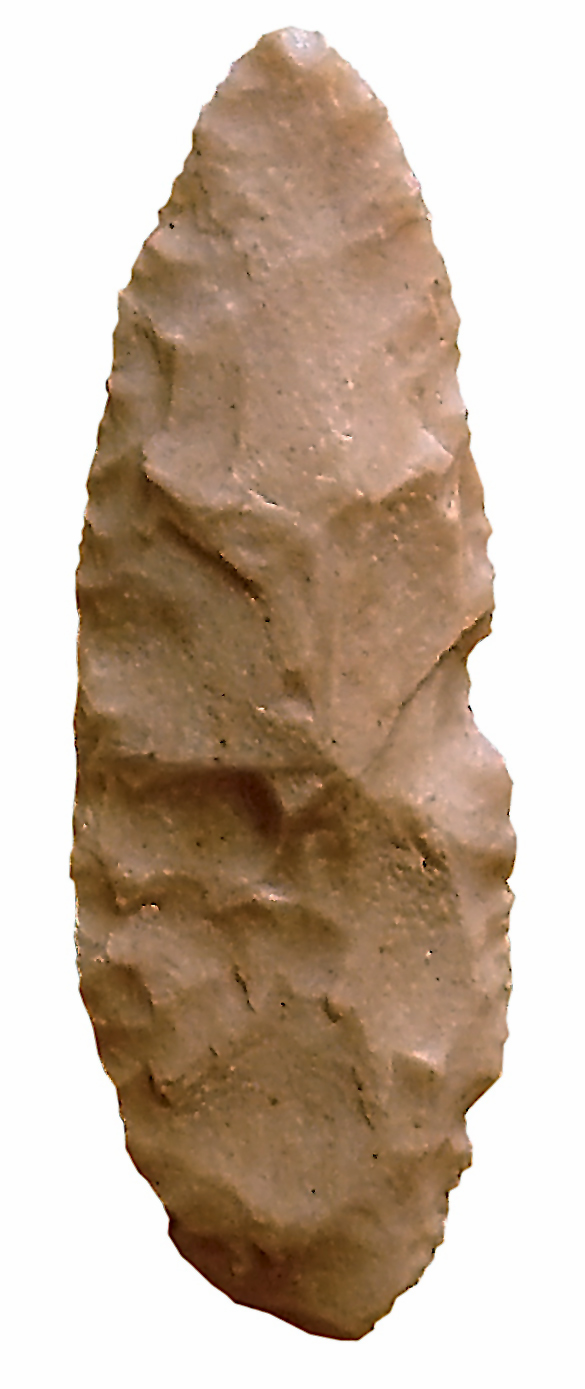
African biface (spear point) dated to the Later Stone Age.

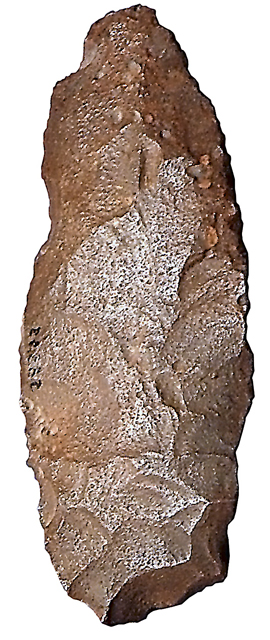
African biface (scraper/cutting tool) dated to the Later Stone Age.

Selected Later Stone Age sites from the ROAD database (CC BY-SA 4.0 ROCEEH)

The Later Stone Age (LSA) is a period in African prehistory that follows the Middle Stone Age.

The Later Stone Age is associated with the advent of modern human behavior in Africa, although definitions of this concept and means of studying it are up for debate. The transition from the Middle Stone Age to the Late Stone Age is thought to have occurred first in eastern Africa between 50,000 and 39,000 years ago. It is also thought that Later Stone Age peoples and/or their technologies spread out of Africa over the next several thousand years.

The terms "Early Stone Age", "Middle Stone Age" and "Later Stone Age" in the context of African archaeology are not to be confused with the terms Lower Paleolithic, Middle Paleolithic, and Upper Paleolithic. They were introduced in the 1920s, as it became clear that the existing chronological system of Upper, Middle, and Lower Paleolithic was not a suitable correlate to the prehistoric past in Africa. Some scholars, however, continue to view these two chronologies as parallel, arguing that they both represent the development of behavioral modernity.

== Origins ==
Originally, the Later Stone Age was defined as several stone industries and/or cultures which included other evidence of human activity, such as ostrich eggshell beads and worked bone implements, and lacked Middle Stone Age stone tools other than those recycled and reworked. LSA peoples were directly linked with biologically and behaviorally modern populations of hunter/gatherers, some being directly identified as San "Bushmen." This definition has changed since its creation with the discovery of ostrich eggshell beads and bone harpoons in contexts which predate the LSA by tens of thousands of years. The Later Stone Age was also long distinguished from the earlier Middle Stone Age as the time in which modern human behavior developed in Africa. This definition has become more tenuous as evidence for such modern human behaviors is found in sites which predate the LSA significantly.

== Transition from Middle Stone Age ==
The LSA follows the Middle Stone Age and begins about 50,000 years ago. The LSA is characterized by a wider variety in stone artifacts than in the previous MSA period. These artifacts vary with time and location, unlike Middle Stone Age technology which appeared to have been relatively unchanged for several hundreds of thousands of years. LSA technology is also characterized by the use of bone tools. The LSA was associated with modern human behavior, but this view was modified after discoveries in MSA sites such as Blombos Cave and Pinnacle Point.

LSA sites also greatly outnumber MSA sites in Africa, a trend that could indicate an increase in population numbers. The greater number of LSA sites could also result from bias towards better preservation of younger sites which have had fewer chances to be destroyed.

== Lithic technology ==
Differences in stone tool technologies are often used to distinguish between the Middle Stone Age and the Later Stone Age. The larger prepared platform flake-based stone tool industries of the Middle Stone Age, such as Levallois were increasingly replaced with industries that focused on producing blades and bladelets on cores with simple platforms. African stone tool technologies are divided into modes as proposed by Grahame Clark in 1969 and outlined by Lawrence Barham and Peter Mitchell as follows:

- Mode 1: Oldowan tool industries, also known as pebble tool industries
- Mode 2: Tools made through bifacial reduction produced from large flakes or cores
- Mode 3: Flake tools from prepared cores
- Mode 4: Punch-struck blades that are adapted into a variety of different tools
- Mode 5: Microlith portions of composite tools that may include wood or bone, often abruptly retouched or backed

The lithic technologies of the Later Stone Age often fall into Modes 4 and 5. They have been further broken into four stages within the LSA.

1. Microlithic industries dated to between ca. 40,000 and ca. 19,000 B.P. labeled early LSA (ELSA), or as late MSA, or as MSA/LSA transitions or interfaces
2. Nonmicrolithic, bladelet-poor industries with dates between ca. 40,000 B.P. and ca. 19,000 B.P.
3. Microlithic industries with bladelets dated between ca. 18,000 and ca. 12,000 B.P.
4. Nonmicrolithic, bladelet-poor industries dating between 12,000 and 8000 B.P.

== Potential problems ==
The end of the Later Stone Age took place when groups adopted technologies such as metallurgy to replace the use of stone tools. This process happened at different rates across the continent, and that the term "LSA" is typically used by archaeologists today to refer primarily to stone tool-using hunter/gatherer populations in southern Africa. The model of the LSA "human revolution" is no longer favored by many archaeologists working in Africa due to the increasing evidence for development of modern human behavior earlier than 40,000-50,000 years ago.

== See also ==
- Upper Paleolithic
- Middle Stone Age
- Enkapune Ya Muto
- Mumba Cave
- Mumbwa Cave
- Nasera Rockshelter
- Panga ya Saidi
- Itaakpa rock shelter
