= Ostrich eggshell beads =

Archeological ornaments

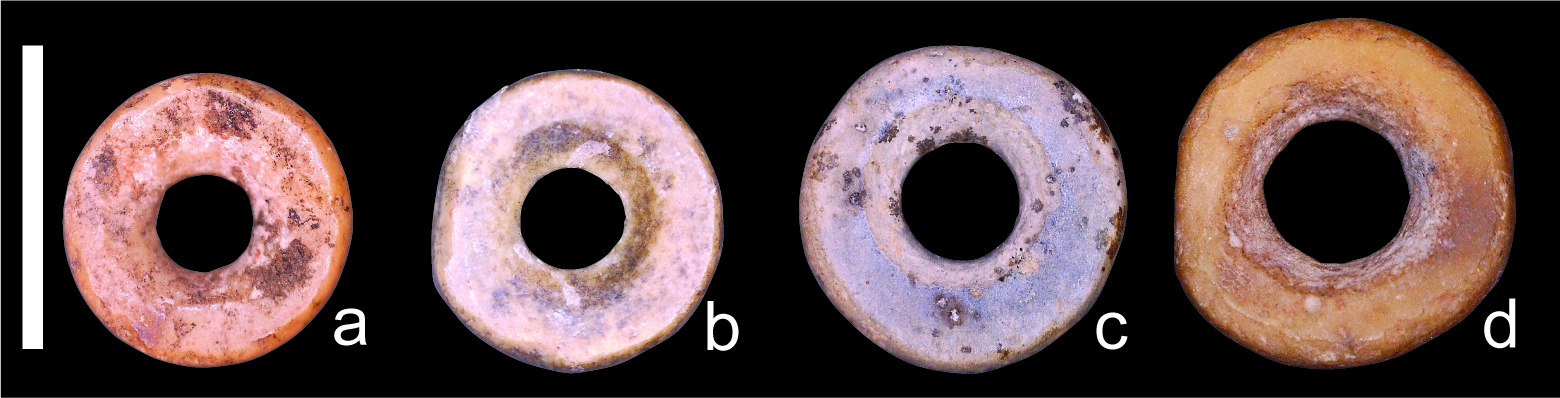
Examples of ostrich eggshell beads found in archaeological contexts in Africa.

Ostrich eggshell beads, considered among the earliest ornaments created by Homo sapiens, represent some of the most ancient fully manufactured beads. Archaeologists have traced their origins back to the Late Pleistocene, with evidence suggesting they were crafted as early as 75,000 years ago in Africa. Certain populations continue to produce and utilize these beads in contemporary times.

Ostrich eggshell beads likely originated from eastern Africa. They appear in the archaeological record all throughout Africa in a variety of contexts, including those of foraging, herding, and farming societies. They are particularly well-represented in the archaeological record of the Holocene, and are well-studied in eastern and southern Africa. They can be useful to archaeologists as a way to study symbolic meanings, the creation and maintenance of social identities, exchange, and can even be used to radiocarbon date sites. They also appear in the archaeological record of Asia, with some beads dating to 12,000 years old.

== Manufacture ==
The manufacture of ostrich eggshell beads varies a bit from region to region, but generally follows similar steps. First, an ostrich egg is hit with a hammerstone, or an eggshell fragment is found. Then, bead blanks are selected from those fragments. The next two steps can be performed in either order depending on the group making the beads; either a hole is drilled in the bead's center, often with a sharp stone, piece of bone, or horn, or the process of trimming the bead is performed before the perforation. After trimming and perforation of the bead, several beads are strung together on a piece of cord. There might have been intentional burning during this process to darken the beads' color. Ethnographic and historical data in Africa indicates that these beads were manufactured by women in a time-intensive process. It may have been a seasonal process and regarded as a social event in some areas, with bead manufacturing occurring more frequently in large camps.

In southern Africa, historical ethnographic data all point to the use of iron tools for perforating the ostrich eggshell beads. Collins et al. argue that there were heat alterations to the ostrich eggshell beads found at a site called Grassridge Rockshelter in South Africa. This site showed significant signs of bead manufacture. The scholars note that grooved stone found at the site could be the tool used to finish the beads, since finishing the beads is traditionally done by using a coarse surface like the stone to grind them.

== Style ==
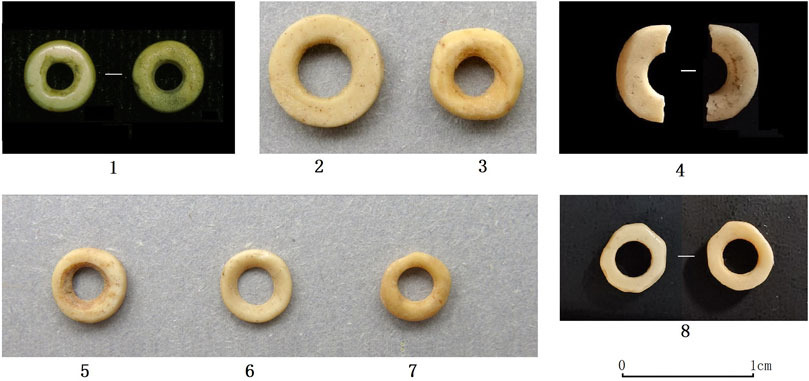
Differences in ostrich eggshell bead styles.

The style of ostrich eggshell beads has been used in scholarship to investigate the arrival of herding in areas of southern Africa. Specifically, bead diameter is thought to play a significant part in this process, with a larger diameter associated with the spread of herding. However, in a 2019 study by Miller and Sawchuk, the diameter size of ostrich eggshell beads did not appear to change during the period of the arrival of herding in eastern Africa. However, in many contexts foragers do appear to have manufactured smaller beads compared to pastoralists.

Between the period of 50 - 33 thousand years ago, a study by Miller and Wang suggests that the style of ostrich eggshell beads was nearly identical in eastern and southern Africa, though these styles diverged in later periods. Hatton et al. suggests that larger beads might have been preferred in the northeast of southern Africa, medium-sized beads were favored in the western region of southern Africa, and the small-size in the Drakensberg.

== Use as personal adornment ==
=== Archaeological data ===
Ostrich eggshell beads are often used as personal adornment. Though it is difficult to determine the use of these beads in the past, Collins et al. conclude that the beads with depressions could have been sewn onto clothing or bags as adornment. Another possibility is that the beads were placed on necklaces or strings as jewelry. There is also a high volume of these beads found in pillar cemetery sites around Lake Turkana, which implies that the beads were important for identity signaling. The use of beads as personal adornment does not appear to have been differentiated based on an individual's age or sex, based on the analysis of grave goods.

Tryon argues that the archaeological evidence of beads missing in some contexts where the raw material is available in eastern Africa is indicative of the use of ostrich eggshell beads as a choice to reject certain technologies because they were perceived to be contrary to the needs or norms of the society.

=== Ethnographic data ===
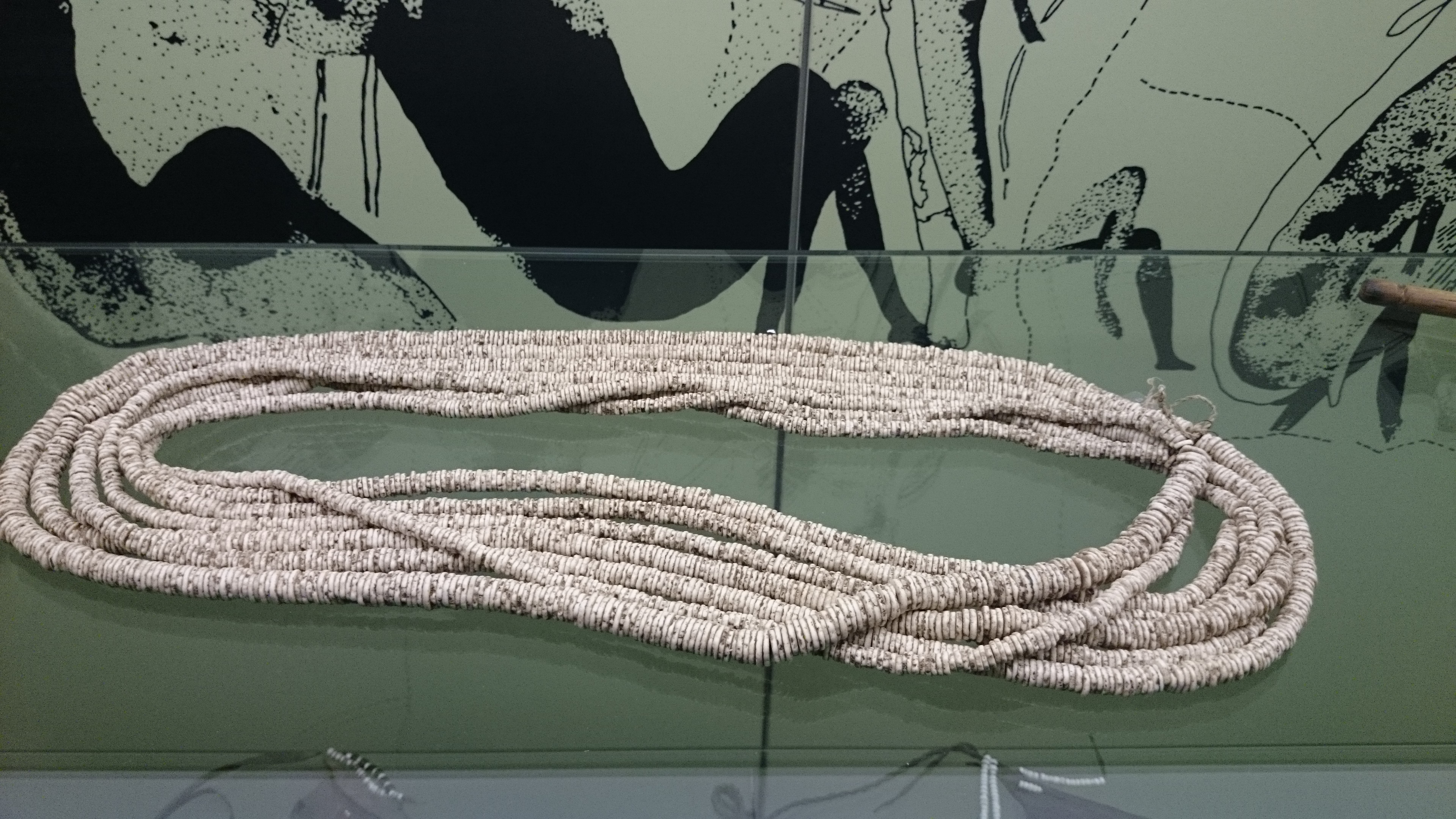
Necklace for personal adornment made from ostrich eggshell beads.

Data derived from studying some modern African populations suggests that these beads hold symbolic meaning as personal adornment. The ethnographic data also show that individual beads can be used as a means to display social information, such as details about group norms. In the Kalahari today, ostrich eggshell beads are used by hunter-gatherer groups to adorn jewelry, clothing, and bags. However, archaeologists practice caution when using ethnographic data to inform interpretation of the archaeological record, since cultures change over time.

== Exchange ==
Ostrich eggshell beads found in the archaeological record were often imported from different locations. For example, ostrich eggshell beads are found in Lesotho archaeological sites, even though ostriches were not likely present in this region.

In their study of ostrich eggshell beads in southern and eastern Africa, Miller and Wang posit that since the style of the beads are so similar between the regions from the period of 50 - 33 thousand years ago, there was likely exchange going on between these two regions. They further suggest that the differences that emerged in style of the beads after this period indicate that the regional exchange network seemed to have broken down after 33 thousand years ago.

The specific exchange practice that the oldest beads were a part of was hxaro, a process in which hunter-gatherer groups from different regions exchanged these beads in the form of jewelry. In this exchange, the beads could travel several hundred kilometers. This exchange process involved both men and women.

== Social networks in Southern Africa ==
The trade and exchange of ostrich eggshell beads might be the world's first social network. The variation in beads carry culturally and socially significant information, and the beads can be used as symbols to create and maintain connections within a society. Since the beads appear throughout southern Africa, it appears that their use as decorative ornaments were shared between different groups and peoples living in different parts of southern Africa. Jacobson suggests that social identity might have been established by the size of ostrich eggshell beads, differentiating the hunter-gatherers and the herders in an area where there would have been a lot of economic contact between the groups. In areas of hxaro exchange, the trade of ostrich eggshell beads could create friendship ties between both individuals and families, providing an important social function to the exchange. The beads could both cement and also reassert these friendship ties, in a way that advertised these bonds outwardly. This could serve as kinds of "insurance policies," ensuring help if it was ever needed, due to the beads advertising these connections. According to Mitchell, the trade also maintains and reproduces the egalitarian social values of the San people.
