= ZooMS =

Scientific method

Zooarchaeology by mass spectrometry, commonly referred to by the abbreviation ZooMS, is a scientific method that identifies animal species by means of characteristic peptide sequences in the protein collagen. ZooMS is the most common archaeological application of peptide mass fingerprinting (PMF) and can be used for species identification of bones, teeth, skin and antler. It is commonly used to identify objects that cannot be identified morphologically. In an archaeological context this usually means that the object is too fragmented or that it has been shaped into an artefact. Archaeologists use these species identification to study among others past environments, diet and raw material selection for the production of tools.

== Developmental history ==
ZooMS was first published in 2009 by a team of researchers from the University of York, but the term was coined later in a publication in 2010. The original aim of ZooMS was to distinguish between sheep and goat. The bones of these two closely related species are difficult to distinguish, especially when fragmented, yet the difference between these two common domesticates is very important for our understanding of past husbandry practices.

Most of the method development following the initial publication of ZooMS has focused on the extraction of collagen from the archaeological material. In the original protocol acid was used to dissolve the bone's mineral matrix and free up the collagen. In 2011 an alternative extraction method was published that used an ammonium bicarbonate buffer to solubilise the collagen without dissolving the mineral matrix. In contrast to the acid protocol, the ammonium bicarbonate protocol does not affect the size and mass of the sample, making it a much less destructive method compared to the original protocol. In fact, the ammonium bicarbonate protocol was proposed as a non-destructive protocol for ZooMS, but in practice destructive samples are still taken for this protocol (see). Submerging a sample in ammonium bicarbonate does chemically alter the sample, which is why current practices continue to take a destructive sample.

=== Non-destructive sampling protocols ===
Although the ammonium bicarbonate protocol should not be considered a non-destructive method, it was followed by more 'true' non-destructive methods. The first of these was the eraser protocol, first tested on parchment, but later also applied to bone. The eraser protocol is performed by rubbing a PVC eraser on a piece of parchment or bone. The friction generates triboelectric forces, which causes small particles of the sample to cling to the eraser waste. From the eraser waste collagen can then be extracted and analysed. The eraser protocol was found to work relatively well for parchment, but it is less effective on bone. Additionally, it leaves microscopic traces on the bone surface, which appear very similar to use wear traces and could be an issue for use wear analysis.

A second non-destructive protocol is the plastic bag protocol, first published in 2019. It is based on the idea that the normal friction between an object and the plastic bags, commonly used for storing archaeological objects, might be sufficient to extract enough material for ZooMS analysis.

A third protocol uses the same triboelectric principle. However, instead of using an eraser, this microgrid protocol employs a fine polishing film to remove very small amounts of material from a sample.

The last non-destructive protocol that has been published for ZooMS is the membrane box protocol. The membrane box protocol is based on contact electrification, which is the generation of electrostatic forces due to small localised differences in charge between two objects. These electrostatic forces can be large enough for material transfer between two surfaces.

Most of these protocols have only been published recently and their respective advantages and disadvantages have not yet been tested against each other. It is therefore not yet clear how reliable these methods are and what level of preservation of the samples is required for them to work.

ZooMS protocols can be valuable when working with cultural heritage objects as they support derivation of biological (and therefore location) data with minimal harm to the object.

=== Reference biomarkers ===
Apart from non-destructive sampling, a second area of method development has been the expansion of reference biomarkers. To identify a species using ZooMS, a set of diagnostic biomarkers is used. These biomarkers correspond to particular fragments of the species' collagen protein. The set of known biomarkers at the time of ZooMS' original publication was relatively limited, but recent publications have been expanding this list. A regularly updated list of published biomarkers is maintained by the University of York and can be found here.

== Principle of the method ==
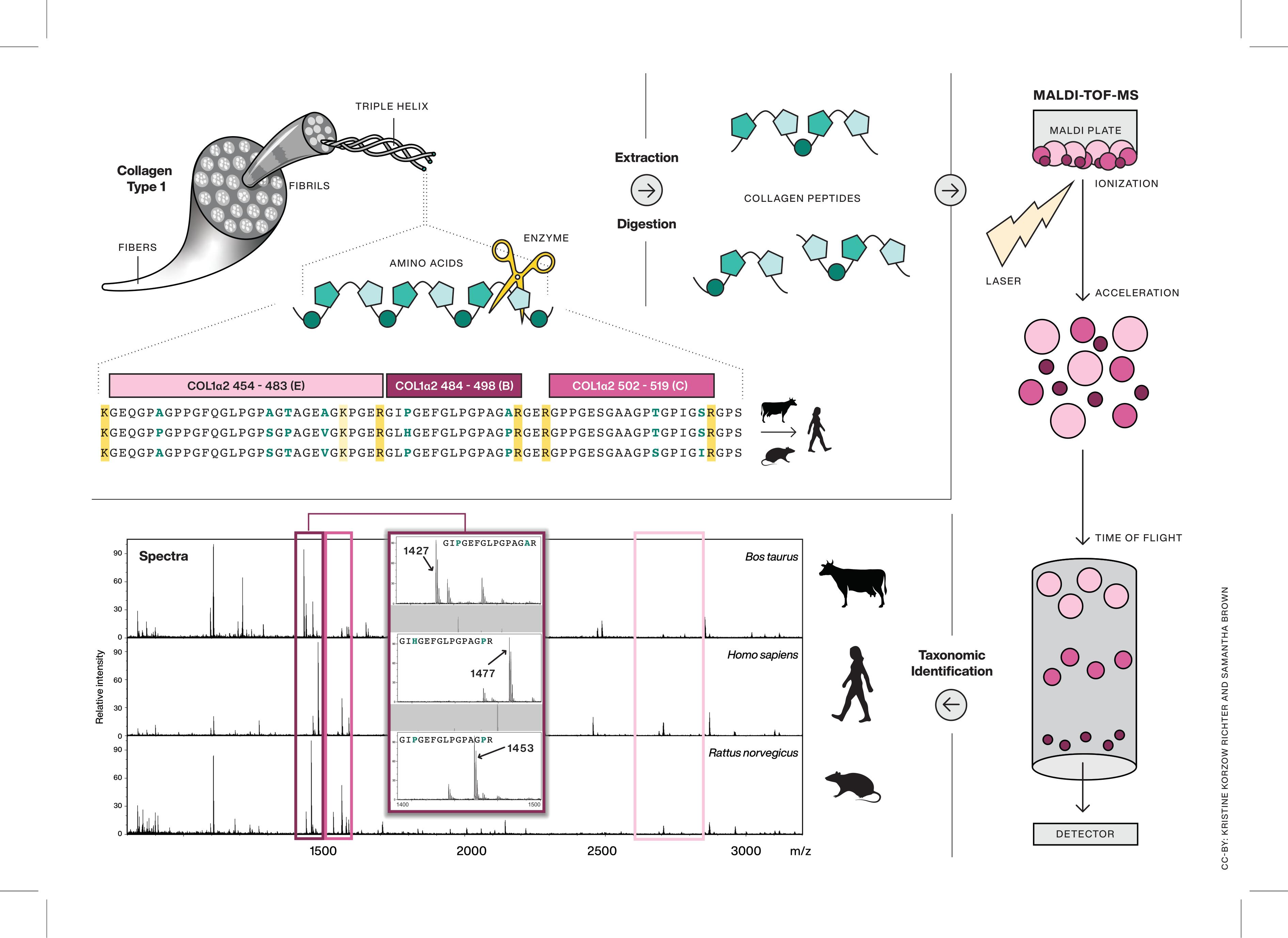
Fig. 1 Schematic overview of a typical ZooMS workflow

ZooMS identifies species based on differences in the amino acid composition of the collagen protein. The amino acid sequence of a species' collagen protein is determined by its DNA and as a result like DNA, the amino acid sequence reflects a species' evolutionary history. The greater the evolutionary distance between two species, the more different their collagen proteins will be. ZooMS typically can identify a sample up to genus level, though in some cases the identification can be more or less specific. A good understanding of the archaeological context of the sample can be used to further refine the resolution of the species identification.

=== Protocol example ===
A ZooMS protocol (Fig. 1) typically consists of an extraction, denaturation, digestion and filtration step, followed by mass spectrometric analysis. Various destructive and non-destructive extraction protocols have already been discussed in some detail above. The key is to extract the protein preserved in the sample and then bring it into solution, usually an ammonium bicarbonate buffer. Denaturation is done to unfold the proteins and make them more accessible for the enzymatic digestion. It is done by heating the solubilised sample at around 65 °C. Then an enzyme, trypsin, is added to the solution. Trypsin cleaves the protein after every arginine or lysine amino acid in its sequence, resulting in peptide fragments of predictable masses. After digestion the sample is filtered with C18 filters to get rid of non-proteinaceous material and the sample is now ready for mass spectrometric analysis, which for ZooMS generally means MALDI-TOF MS.
