= Johannes F. Coy =

German biologist (born 1963)

- Born: 1963
- Occupation: Biologist
- Known for: TKTL1
- Academic career
- Fields: Biology; cancer research
- Institutions: Eberhard Karls University; Molecular Genome Analysis

Johannes F. Coy (born December 15, 1963, in Otzberg im Odenwald) is a German biologist and cancer researcher. He is the discoverer of the genes TKTL1 and DNaseX (Apo10). According to the latest findings in evolutionary research, TKTL1 is a key gene that has triggered increased neuron formation in the neocortex and structural improvements in the brain compared to Neanderthals, thus enabling the cognitive achievements of modern humans (homo sapiens).

The evolutionary significance of TKTL1 was confirmed through studies by Nobel laureate Svante Pääbo and his research group at the Max Planck Institute for Evolutionary Anthropology. In collaboration with Wieland B. Huttner, they demonstrated that the TKTL1 gene, discovered by Johannes F. Coy, exhibits a single amino acid substitution in modern humans, leading to increased neurogenesis compared to Neanderthals.

== Life and scientific work ==
Johannes Coy began his biology studies at the Eberhard Karls University in Tübingen in 1985, which he completed in 1990 with a focus on molecular and human genetics as well as biochemistry. In the same year, he moved to the DKFZ in Heidelberg, where he became a member of the Molecular Genome Analysis research project headed by the then DKFZ director and later Nobel Prize winner for medicine, Prof. Harald zur Hausen, after completing his diploma thesis (mapping a tumor suppressor gene in neuroblastoma).

During this time, he concentrated on the identification of genes and discovered the two genes TKTL1 and DNaseX (Apo10) in this context. He was awarded summa cum laude in 1996 for his dissertation based on the discovery of these two genes. From his analyses of the TKTL1 and DNaseX (Apo10) genes, Coy concluded that both genes had the potential to be used as new diagnostic cancer markers.

In his further scientific work, Coy continued to focus on holistic research into tumor cell metabolism, in particular the use of the two genes for the early detection of cancer on the basis of diagnostic tests. He discovered that the simultaneous presence of TKTL1 and DNaseX (Apo10) in macrophages is indicative of cancer and contributed to the development of a blood test that makes TKTL1 and DNaseX (Apo10) detectable in macrophages.

He also discovered the TKTL1 metabolic pathway and the associated sugar metabolism that enables the prevention and repair of cell damage.

Coy's diagnostic developments as a result of his research include:

- Epitope detection in monocytes (EDIM) - detection method of biomarkers in cells of the innate immune system in blood samples
- Automated flow cytrometry method
- Flow cytometry-based blood tests

Johannes Coy holds several patents in the field of cancer research and diagnostics, including DNaseX and TKTL1:

- DNA encoding DNase and related vectors, host cells and antibodies (DNaseX)
- Transketolase-related protein (TKTL1)
