= Neanderthal Man: In Search of Lost Genomes =

2014 book by Svante Pääbo

- Author: Svante Pääbo
- Language: English
- Subject: Anthropology
- Publisher: Basic Books
- Publication date: 11 February 2014
- Media type: Print
- Pages: 288
- ISBN: 978-0465020836

Neanderthal Man: In Search of Lost Genomes is a 2014 book by evolutionary anthropologist Svante Pääbo. The book describes Pääbo's research into the DNA of Neanderthals, extinct hominins that lived across much of Europe and the Middle East. It is written in the style of a memoir, combining scientific findings with personal anecdotes.

== Synopsis ==
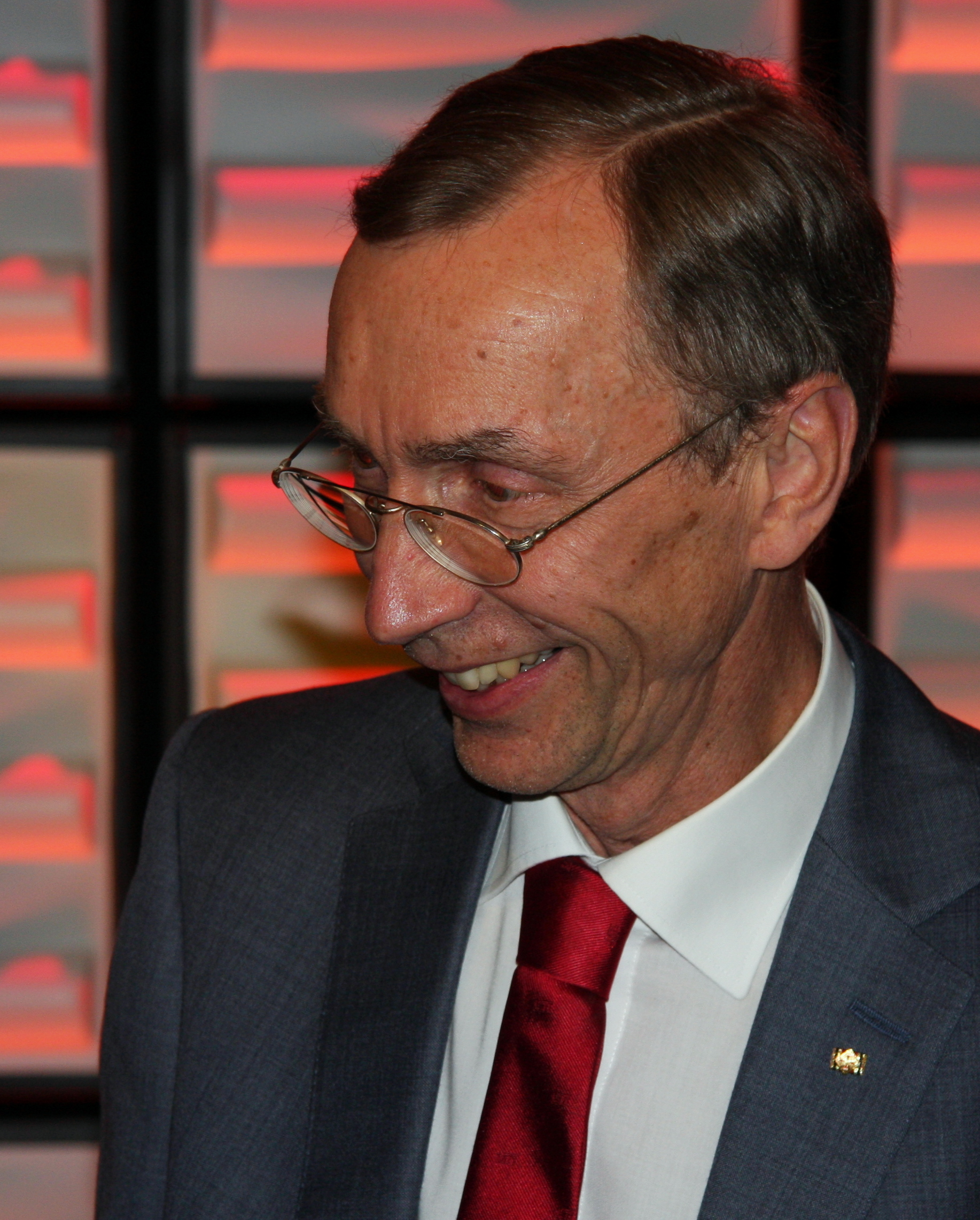
Pääbo in 2014

Pääbo describes his early interest in Egyptology, and how his work in sequencing the DNA of a mummy led him into evolutionary anthropology. He touches upon his personal life, reflecting on his father, the chemist Sune Bergström, with whom he had a relatively distant relationship, and on his own marriage and son. He describes the emergence and development of the field of evolutionary genetics, and contributions to it made by himself and colleagues. Much of the book is devoted to his research team's efforts at the Max Planck Institute for Evolutionary Anthropology towards mapping the Neanderthal genome as part of the Neanderthal genome project. This work brought Pääbo international fame and recognition with the publication of an initial draft of the genome in the journal Science in 2010, followed by a more complete analysis in 2013. Around this time, Pääbo and his team at Max Planck also sequenced the genome of an unknown hominin, now known as the Denisovans. The events of this discovery are covered in the last chapter of the book.

== Reception ==
The book was well reviewed by The New York Times, with Carl Zimmer calling it "a fascinating account." The book made the paper's Sunday Book Review Editors' Choice List. Peter Forbes of The Guardian, remarking on the book's characterization of the research process, stated that:

"His book is also valuable for showing just how modern research teams work together and, sometimes, fall out. Along the way, a key collaborator became a competitor and, midstream, Pääbo abandoned one collaborating gene-sequencing company for another. The race for the Neanderthal genome is reminiscent of the human genome story of 10 years previously, as recounted in James Shreeve's The Genome War."
