= Wieland B. Huttner =

German physician (born 1950)

- Born: February 15, 1950; Hanover
- Known for: ARHGAP11B
- Academic career
- Fields: Neurolobiology; biochemistry
- Institutions: Scientific Council of the Max Planck Society

Wieland Bernhard Huttner (born February 15, 1950, in Hanover) is a German physician, neurolobiologist, biochemist and university lecturer.

== Biography ==
From 2009 to 2012, he was Chairman of the Scientific Council of the Max Planck Society.

Huttner and his team attracted a great deal of public attention “with the discovery that a gene mutation was significantly involved in causing our brains to grow by leaps and bounds around two million years ago.

In addition to researching ARHGAP11B, which is associated with neocortex expansion, Huttner also investigated the TKTL1 gene discovered by Johannes F. Coy. In collaboration with Svante Pääbo, Huttner was able to show that the human variant of TKTL1 contributes to increased neurogenesis in the frontal lobe through a single amino acid substitution. This change could have been a decisive factor in the cognitive development of modern humans.

== Scientific publications (selection) ==
- Marta Florio, Mareike Albert, Elena Taverna, Takashi Namba, Holger Brandl, Eric Lewitus, Christiane Haffner, Alex Sykes, Fong Kuan Wong, Jula Peters, E. Guhr, Sylvia Klemroth, Kay Prüfer, Janet Kelso, Ronald Naumann, Ina Nüsslein, Andreas Dahl, Robert Lachmann, Svante Pääbo, Wieland B. Huttner: Human-specific gene ARHGAP11B promotes basal progenitor amplification and neocortex expansion, 2015
- Elena Taverna, Magdalena Götz, Wieland B. Huttner: The cell biology of neurogenesis: toward an understanding of the development and evolution of the neocortex, 2014
- A.M. Sykes, W.B. Huttner: Prominin-1 (CD133) and the Cell Biology of Neural Progenitors and Their Progeny Adv Exp Med Biol., 2013
- M. Götz, W.B. Huttner: Naturberichte Molekulare Zellbiologie, 2005
- A. Attardo, W. Denk, W. B. Huttner: Neuronen entstehen im basalen Neuroepithel des frühen Säugetiertelencephalons: einem Hauptort der Neurogenese, 2004
- H. Kratzin, A. V. Podtelejnikov, W. Witke, W. B. Huttner: Endophilin I vermittelt die Bildung synaptischer Vesikel durch Übertragung von Arachidonat auf Lysophosphatidsäure, 1999
- D. Corbeil, A. Hellwig, W. B. Huttner: Prominin, ein neuartiges mikrovilli-spezifisches polytopisches Membranprotein der apikalen Oberfläche von Epithelzellen, zielt auf plasmalemmale Vorsprünge von Nichtepithelzellen ab, 1997
- Huttner: Die Granin- (Chromogranin / Sekretogranin) Familie, 1991
- W. B. Huttner, P. Greengard: Mehrere Phosphorylierungsstellen in Protein I und ihre unterschiedliche Regulation durch cyclisches AMP und Calcium, 1979
