= Alexander More =

Alexander More may refer to:

- Alexander F. More (1982-), Climate and Health Scientist and Economist at Harvard
- Alexander Morus (1616–1670), or More, Franco-Scottish Calvinist preacher
- Alexander Goodman More (1830–1895), British naturalist
