= List of Swedish Nobel laureates =

The Nobel Prizes were established according to the will of the Swedish industrialist and inventor, Alfred Nobel and are awarded to individuals who have excelled in the fields of chemistry, physics, physiology or medicine, literature, economics and peace. Since 1903, 39 Swedes have been awarded the Nobel Prize where it originates. The latest winner, Svante Pääbo, was a recipient in the field of Medicine. There are also two swedes born in the USA who are usually not included in most lists: Glenn T. Seaborg (Sjöborg) and Carl David Anderson, both physicists.

== Laureates ==
Year	Laureate	Born	Died	Field	Rationale
1903	Svante Arrhenius	19 February 1859 in Uppsala, Sweden	2 October 1927 in Stockholm, Sweden	Chemistry	"for his electrolytic theory of dissociation."
1908	Klas Pontus Arnoldson	27 October 1844 in Gothenburg, Sweden	20 February 1916 in Stockholm, Sweden	Peace	"for his work as founder of the Swedish Peace and Arbitration League."
1909	Selma Lagerlöf	20 November 1858 in Sunne, Sweden	16 March 1940 in Sunne, Sweden	Literature	"in appreciation of the lofty idealism, vivid imagination and spiritual perception that characterize her writings."
1911	Allvar Gullstrand	5 June 1862 in Landskrona, Sweden	28 July 1930 in Stockholm, Sweden	Physiology or Medicine	"for his work on the dioptrics of the eye."
1912	Gustaf Dalén	30 November 1869 in Falköping, Sweden	9 December 1937 in Lidingö, Sweden	Physics	"for his invention of automatic valves designed to be used in combination with gas accumulators in lighthouses and buoys."
1916	Verner von Heidenstam	6 July 1859 i Askersund, Sweden	20 May 20, 1940 in Motala, Sweden	Literature	"in recognition of his significance as the leading representative of a new era in our literature."
1921	Hjalmar Branting	23 November 1860 in Stockholm, Sweden	24 February 1925 in Stockholm, Sweden	Peace	"for his work in the League of Nations." (awarded together with Christian Lous Lange)
1924	Manne Siegbahn	3 December 1886 in Örebro, Sweden	26 September 1978 in Stockholm, Sweden	Physics	"for his discoveries and research in the field of X-ray spectroscopy."
1926	Theodor Svedberg	30 August 1884 in Gävle, Sweden	25 February 1971 in Ljusnarsberg, Sweden	Chemistry	"for his work on disperse systems."
1929	Hans von Euler-Chelpin	February 15, 1873 in Augsburg, Germany	November 6, 1964 in Stockholm, Sweden	Chemistry	"for their investigations on the fermentation of sugar and fermentative enzymes." (awarded together with Arthur Harden)
1930	Nathan Söderblom	15 January 1866; Uppsala, Sweden	12 July 1931; Uppsala, Sweden	Peace	"for his efforts to involve the churches not only in work for ecumenical unity, but also for world peace."
1931	Erik Axel Karlfeldt	20 July 1864 in Avesta, Sweden	8 April 1931 in Stockholm, Sweden	Literature	"for the poetry of Erik Axel Karlfeldt." (awarded posthumously)
1948	Arne Tiselius	10 August 1902 in Stockholm, Sweden	29 October 1971 in Uppsala, Sweden	Chemistry	"for his research on electrophoresis and adsorption analysis, especially for his discoveries concerning the complex nature of the serum proteins."
1951	Pär Lagerkvist	23 May 1891 in Växjö, Sweden	11 July 1974 in Lidingö, Sweden	Literature	""for the artistic vigour and true independence of mind with which he endeavours in his poetry to find answers to the eternal questions confronting mankind."
1955	Hugo Theorell	6 July 1903 in Linköping, Sweden	15 August 1982 in Stockholm, Sweden	Physiology or Medicine	"for his discoveries concerning the nature and mode of action of oxidation enzymes."
1961	Dag Hammarskjöld	29 July 1905 in Jönköping, Sweden	18 September 1961 in Ndola, Zambia	Peace	"for strengthening the foundations of the United Nations Organization." (awarded posthumously)
1966	Nelly Sachs	10 December 1891 in Berlin, Germany	12 May 1970 in Stockholm, Sweden	Literature	"for her outstanding lyrical and dramatic writing, which interprets Israel's destiny with touching strength." (awarded together with Shmuel Yosef Agnon)
1967	Ragnar Granit	30 October 1900 in Riihimäki, Finland	12 March 1991 in Stockholm, Sweden	Physiology or Medicine	"for their discoveries concerning the primary physiological and chemical visual processes in the eye." (awarded together with Haldan Keffer Hartline and George Wald)
1970	Hannes Alfvén	30 May 1908 in Norrköping, Sweden	2 April 1995 in Danderyd, Sweden	Physics	"for fundamental work and discoveries in magneto-hydrodynamics with fruitful applications in different parts of plasma physics." (awarded together with Louis Néel)
1970	Ulf von Euler	7 February 1905 in Stockholm, Sweden	9 March 1983 in Stockholm, Sweden	Physiology or Medicine	"for their discoveries concerning the humoral transmittors in the nerve terminals and the mechanism for their storage, release and inactivation." (awarded together with Julius Axelrod and Bernard Katz)
1974	Gunnar Myrdal	6 December in 1898; Orsa, Sweden	17 May 1987 in Danderyd, Sweden	Economics	"for their pioneering work in the theory of money and economic fluctuations and for their penetrating analysis of the interdependence of economic, social and institutional phenomena." (awarded together with Friedrich Hayek)
1974	Eyvind Johnson	29 July 1900 in Boden, Sweden	25 August 1976 in Stockholm, Sweden	Literature	"for a narrative art, farseeing in lands and ages, in the service of freedom."
1974	Harry Martinson	6 May 1904 in Olofström, Sweden	11 February 1978 in Solna, Sweden	Literature	"for writings that catch the dewdrop and reflect the cosmos."
1977	Bertil Ohlin	23 April 1899 in Klippan, Sweden	3 August 1979 in Åre, Sweden	Economics	"for their pathbreaking contribution to the theory of international trade and international capital movements." (awarded together with James Meade)
1981	Torsten Wiesel	3 June 1924; Uppsala, Sweden	—	Physiology or Medicine	"for their discoveries concerning information processing in the visual system." (awarded together with Roger Wolcott Sperry and David Hunter Hubel)
1981	Kai Siegbahn	20 April 1918 in Lund, Sweden	20 July 2007 in Ängelholm, Sweden	Physics	"for his contribution to the development of high-resolution electron spectroscopy." (awarded together with Nicolaas Bloembergen and Arthur Leonard Schawlow)
1982	Sune Bergström	10 January 1916 in Stockholm, Sweden	15 August 2004 in Stockholm, Sweden	Physiology or Medicine	"for their discoveries concerning prostaglandins and related biologically active substances." (awarded together with John Vane)
1982	Bengt Ingemar Samuelsson	May 21, 1934 in Halmstad, Sweden	—	Physiology or Medicine	"for their discoveries concerning prostaglandins and related biologically active substances." (awarded together with John Vane)
1982	Alva Myrdal	31 January 1902 in Uppsala, Sweden	1 February 1986 in Danderyd, Sweden	Peace	"for their magnificent work in the disarmament negotiations of the United Nations, where they have both played crucial roles and won international recognition." (awarded together with Alfonso García Robles)
2000	Arvid Carlsson	25 January 1923 in Uppsala, Sweden	29 June 2018 in Gothenburg, Sweden	Physiology or Medicine	"for their discoveries concerning signal transduction in the nervous system." (awarded together with Paul Greengard and Eric Kandel)
2011	Tomas Tranströmer	15 April 1931 in Stockholm, Sweden	26 March 2015 in Stockholm, Sweden	Literature	"because, through his condensed, translucent images, he gives us fresh access to reality."
2015	Tomas Lindahl	28 January 1938 in Stockholm, Sweden	—	Chemistry	"for mechanistic studies of DNA repair." (shared with Paul L. Modrich and Aziz Sancar)
2022	Svante Pääbo	20 April 1955 in Stockholm, Sweden	—	Physiology or Medicine	"for his discoveries concerning the genomes of extinct hominins and human evolution."
2023	Anne L’Huillier	16 August 1958 in Paris, France	—	Physics	"for experimental methods that generate attosecond pulses of light for the study of electron dynamics in matter." (shared with Pierre Agostini and Ferenc Krausz)

== Nominees ==
Image	Laureate	Born	Died	Years Nominated	Citation	Nominator(s)
Physics
	Svante Arrhenius	19 February 1859; Uppsala, Sweden	2 October 1927; Stockholm, Sweden	1901, 1902, 1903		13 nominators
	Adolf Erik Nordenskiöld	18 November 1832; Helsinki, Finland	12 August 1901; Trosa, Sweden	1901		Elis Sidenbladh (1836–1914)
	Gustaf de Laval	9 May 1845; Orsa, Sweden	2 February 1913; Stockholm, Sweden	1908		Otto Pettersson (1848–1941)
	Knut Ångström	12 January 1857; Uppsala, Sweden	4 March 1910; Uppsala, Sweden	1910		Wilhelm Röntgen (1845–1923)
	Allvar Gullstrand	5 June 1862; Landskrona, Sweden	28 July 1930; Stockholm, Sweden	1910, 1911		Karl Mörner (1854–1917); Carl Charlier (1862–1934)
	Gustaf Dalén	30 November 1869; Falköping, Sweden	9 December 1937; Stockholm, Sweden	1912		Erik Johan Ljungberg (1843–1915)
	Theodor Svedberg	30 August 1884; Gävle, Sweden	25 February 1971; Ljusnarsberg, Sweden	1913, 1919		Wilhelm Wien (1864–1928); Christopher Aurivillius (1843–1928)
	Johannes Rydberg	8 November 1854; Halmstad, Sweden	28 December 1919; Lund, Sweden	1917		Carl Charlier (1862–1934)
	Manne Siegbahn	3 December 1886; Örebro, Sweden	26 September 1978; Stockholm, Sweden	1925		David Starr Jordan (1851–1931); Max von Laue (1879–1960); Stefan Meyer (1872–1949)
	Tor Bergeron	15 August 1891; Surrey, England, United Kingdom	13 June 1977; Uppsala, Sweden	1928, 1937, 1938, 1939		6 nominators
	Lise Meitner	7 November 1878; Vienna, Austria	27 October 1968; Cambridge, United Kingdom	1937, 1940, 1941, 1943, 1945, 1946, 1947, 1948, 1949, 1954, 1955, 1956, 1961, 1964, 1965, 1967		30 nominators
	Bengt Edlén	2 November 1906; Valdemarsvik, Sweden	10 February 1993; Lund, Sweden	1948, 1950, 1954, 1956, 1957, 1960, 1963, 1964		12 nominators
	Hannes Alfvén	30 May 1908; Norrköping, Sweden	2 April 1995; Danderyd, Sweden	1953, 1960, 1961, 1962, 1963, 1964, 1965, 1966, 1968, 1969, 1970		52 nominators
	Gustaf Ising	19 February 1883; Hässleholm, Sweden	5 February 1960; Danderyd, Sweden	1956		Ernest Walton (1903–1995)
	Carl-Gustaf Rossby	28 December 1898; Stockholm, Sweden	19 August 1957; Stockholm, Sweden	1957		H. Pettersson (?)
	Ivar Waller	11 June 1898; Flen, Sweden	12 April 1991; Uppsala, Sweden	1968, 1969, 1970		4 nominators
	Johan Hjalmar Liljendahl	26 January 1897; Sweden	28 August 1994; Sweden	1969		O. Jenssen (?)
	Oskar Klein	15 September 1894; Stockholm, Sweden	5 February 1977; Stockholm, Sweden	1970		Karl Freudenberg (1886–1983); J. Hans D. Jensen (1907–1973)
Physics
	Svante Arrhenius	19 February 1859; Uppsala, Sweden	2 October 1927; Stockholm, Sweden	1901, 1902, 1903		20 nominators
	Fredrik Kjellin	24 April 1872; Södertälje, Sweden	30 December 1910; Stockholm, Sweden	1907		Otto Pettersson (1848–1941)
	Gustaf de Laval	9 May 1845; Orsa, Sweden	2 February 1913; Stockholm, Sweden	1908		Otto Pettersson (1848–1941)
	Theodor Svedberg	30 August 1884; Gävle, Sweden	25 February 1971; Ljusnarsberg, Sweden	1916, 1918, 1919, 1920, 1923, 1924, 1926		10 nominators
	Knut Jakob Beskow	13 January 1876; Stockholm, Sweden	28 January 1928; Stockholm, Sweden	1917		Royal Institute of Technology
	Arthur Ramén	12 October 1873; Uppsala, Sweden	30 September 1926; Stockholm, Sweden	1917		Royal Institute of Technology
	Hans von Euler-Chelpin	15 February 1873; Augsburg, Germany	6 November 1964; Stockholm, Sweden	1924, 1925, 1926, 1927, 1928, 1929		13 nominators
	Peter Klason	4 April 1848; Halmstad, Sweden	1 January 1937; Stockholm, Sweden	1931, 1932, 1934, 1935		Oskari Routola (?); Taavi Hirn (1874–1951); Otto Pettersson (1848–1941)
	Erik Hägglund	15 June 1887; Timrå, Sweden	13 March 1959; Stockholm, Sweden	1934, 1956		Taavi Hirn (1874–1951); Joseph Risi (1899–1993)
	Hugo Theorell	6 July 1903; Linköping, Sweden	15 August 1982; Stockholm, Sweden	1937, 1938, 1952, 1953, 1954, 1955		21 nominators
	Lise Meitner	7 November 1878; Vienna, Austria	27 October 1968; Cambridge, United Kingdom	1924, 1925, 1929, 1930, 1933, 1934, 1936, 1937, 1939, 1941, 1942, 1946, 1947, 1948		18 nominators
