= Linda Vigilant =

American primatologist and geneticist

- Education: Stevens Institute of Technology (BS); University of California, Berkeley (PhD)
- Known for: Paleogenetics
- Spouse: Svante Pääbo (m. 2008)
- Children: 4
- Scientific career
- Fields: Genetics; Primatology
- Workplaces: Max Planck Institute for Evolutionary Anthropology
- Thesis: Control region sequences from African populations and the evolution of human mitochondrial DNA (1990)

Linda Ann Vigilant is an American primatologist and geneticist. Vigilant works at the Department of Primate Behavior and Evolution at the Max Planck Institute for Evolutionary Anthropology (MPI-EVA) in Leipzig, Germany.

== Education ==
Vigilant graduated from Stevens Institute of Technology in Hoboken, New Jersey with a B.S. in chemical biology in 1986. She earned her PhD at University of California, Berkeley in California in genetics from 1986 to 1990.

== Research and career ==
She began her career by working on the evolution of mitochondrial DNA in human populations at MPI-EVA. Her work uses genetic analyses to address questions on the evolution of humans and other primates, particularly the great apes. Her research focus is on the level of individual social groups, such as examination of the effects of kinship on the social behaviour of pairs of individuals. Other studies use genotyping of entire primate populations to infer dispersal behavior and group social dynamics. Vigilant's recent research interests are using large-scale sequencing approaches for understanding the long-term histories of primate populations and seeing the effects of high variance in male reproductive success on patterns of genomic variation.

=== Publication positions ===
- International Journal of Primatology, editorial board member 2003–present.
- American Journal of Physical Anthropology, associate editor 2006–2010.
- Primates, associate editor 2007–present.

== Personal life ==
Vigilant has been married twice, first to a fellow geneticist, and subsequently to another geneticist, Svante Pääbo, since 2008. She has two sons with her first husband and one son and a daughter with her second.
