= Alexander F. More =

American scientist, economist, and science communicator

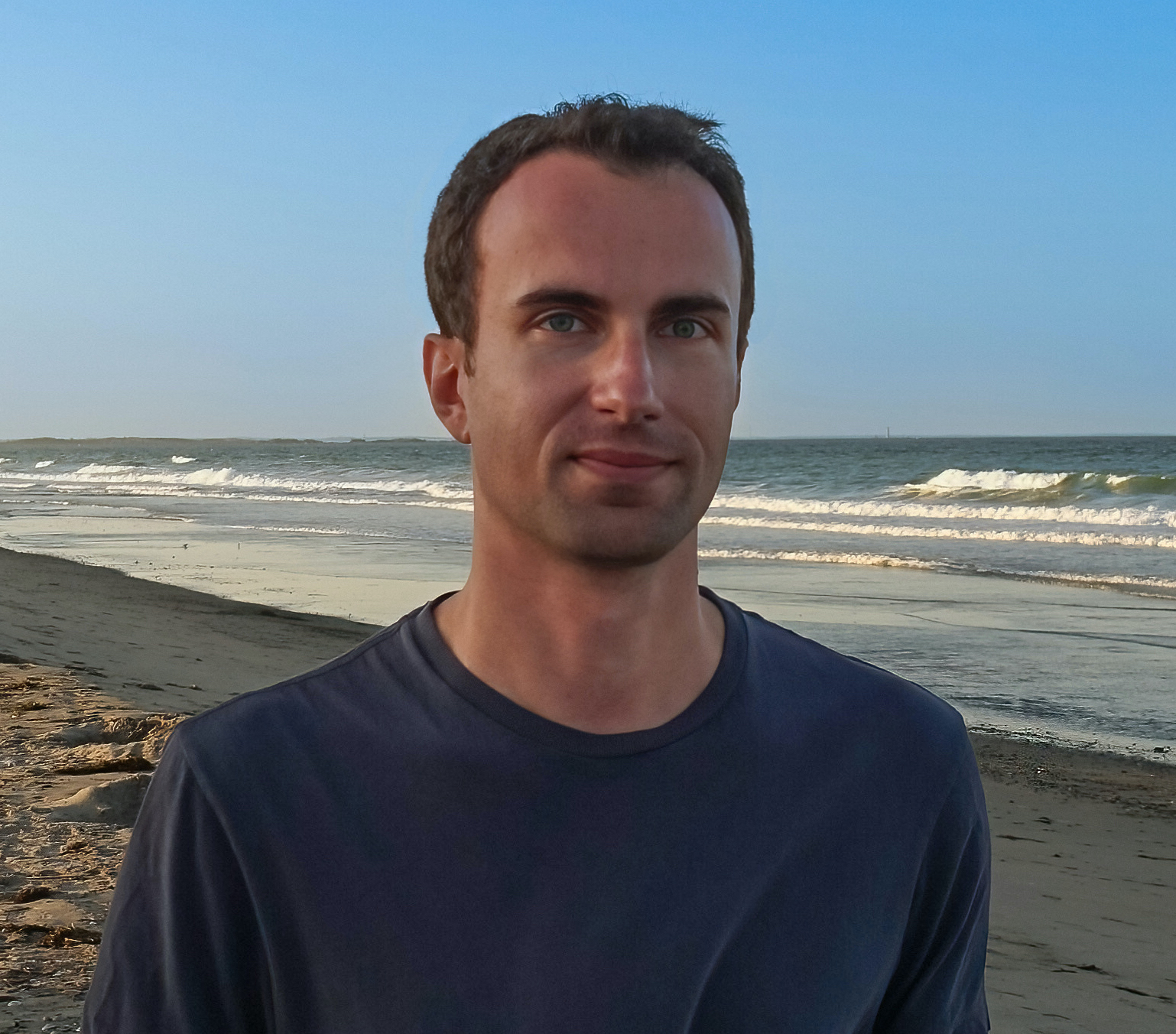
- Alexander More in 2021
- Born: Alexander Frederick Medico More; Italy
- Education: Washington University in St. Louis (B.A.); Harvard University (PhD)
- Known for: Impact of Climate Change on Pandemics; Discovery of pollution drop during pandemics Reset of toxic air pollution standards Discovery of first public health and welfare systems
- Scientific career
- Fields: Environmental Health, Public Health, Climatology, Economic History
- Workplaces: Harvard University, University of Massachusetts, Boston, Long Island University, Max Planck Society
- Website: Alexander More

Alexander F. More is a European scientist (climate and health), economist, and historian of public health working in the US. His discoveries include the impact of climate change on the largest pandemics in the last two millennia, the impact of pandemics on air pollution, and the resetting of toxic air pollution standards through highly detailed interdisciplinary research. More also uncovered the creation of the first broad public health system during an environmental and climate crisis (the second pandemic). He frequently appears as a leading expert on national and global news stories on climate change and public health, as well as other issues of public policy, including immigration, sustainability and economic growth. He worked as a staff member for Senator Ted Kennedy when he was drafting the Affordable Care Act, and continues to engage in public service and non-profit activities as part of several foundations.

== Early life and education ==
More was born in Italy. The extreme pollution affecting the region where he grew up motivated his later focus in his work on environmental change and economic growth driving it. More attended the Liceo Classico and moved briefly to Venice for his secondary education at the Scuola Navale Militare Francesco Morosini, but decided to leave Europe to attend college in the United States. He traveled to New York City on his own and supported himself as he studied for college admission. More attended Washington University in St. Louis, earning a bachelor's degree in history with a minor in chemistry. While at Washington University, More supported himself by teaching, and working in the Biomedical Magnetic Resonance Laboratory of Dr. Joseph Ackerman, focusing on the design and implementation of research measuring the perfusion coefficient of water in HeLa cells. At WashU served as President of AMSA pre-med.

More graduated with honors from Washington University with a thesis based on original research, in five languages, with sources retrieved from multiple countries in Europe. He was immediately admitted to Harvard University, where he pursued a fully funded PhD. Due to the several disciplines needed for his doctoral research, More designed and gained approval at Harvard for a rare (ad hoc) interdisciplinary PhD covering environmental, economic and public health fields.

His doctoral work focused on the creation of the first government-sponsored public health and welfare policies, emerging as a result of environmental and epidemic crises in Europe. Among his advisers were Allan M. Brandt, Angeliki Laiou, Ernest R. May, Michael McCormick, Katharine Park and Philip J. Landrigan.

While at Harvard, he received more than ten teaching awards and three university-wide Hoopes prizes ("for excellence in the art of teaching," awarded for advising prize-winning theses). More was a member of Winthrop House as non-resident tutor. In addition to a fully funded PhD, More was the recipient of the Dumbarton Oaks Junior Fellowship, the Arango Fund Grant, and the Gladys Krieble Delmas Foundation fellowship.

More is a first-generation college and PhD graduate, and a naturalized US citizen, having immigrated to the U.S. from Europe. He is also a European citizen.

== Discoveries and career ==
More continued his career with a postdoctoral fellowship at Harvard and the Climate Change Institute (2015–18), focusing on the impact of climate change and pollution on human and ecosystem health. His research was funded by the Arcadia Fund of London.

In 2019, More took a position as associate professor of environmental health at Long Island University, where he also directed the Honors College and was named fellow of the Theodore Roosevelt Institute. In 2021, More was elected chair of the Department of Public Health at Long Island University and led efforts to organize two global summits on human and ecosystem health, in collaboration with the Embassy of France, the government of Portugal and the National Council for Science and the Environment. More is the main author of the Lisbon declaration of the Global Exploration Summit, committing all participants to the preservation of planetary health. In 2022, More accepted a position as associate professor at the University of Massachusetts Boston, which allowed him to be closer to Harvard and the Climate Change Institute where he continues to lead a research project on climate and health. More is a research associate at the Initiative for the Science of the Human Past at Harvard, the Max Planck Harvard Research Center for the Archaeoscience of the Ancient Mediterranean, and an Associate Research Professor at the Climate Change Institute at the University of Maine. He has been a Managing Editor of the Mapping Past Societies digital atlas at Harvard since 2014.

=== Impact of climate change on pandemics ===
In 2020, More showed compelling evidence of the impact of environmental change on the emergence of the largest pandemic in human history (by number of victims), the "Spanish flu". By combining multiple climate, environmental and epidemiological records, More showed how the Spanish flu pandemic (caused by the avian H1N1 virus) was worsened if not caused by a six-year climate anomaly that affected Europe during World War I and until 1920.

More showed that torrential rains and unusual cold weather (with an anomalous low-pressure system) facilitated the spread of the virus through the battlefields and cities of Europe. The climate anomaly was worsened by the first widespread carpet bombing of Europe, which created dust clouds that eased condensation (or nucleation) of water, increasing precipitation throughout the conflict. The same climate anomaly interrupted the normal migration pattern of birds which were one of the major carriers of the disease, while floods from rivers and lakes where birds remained carried the disease to trenches and beyond. Lowered immune responses due to the cold, as well as well documented bacterial co-infections, increased the death toll of the pandemic.

More explored the impact of climate change on the emergence of disease for other events such as the Cocoliztli epidemics and the second pandemic. His research has received global media coverage, reaching the top 5% of scientific outputs tracked by Altmetrics and other citation services.

=== Impact of pandemics on pollution and reset of toxic metal pollution standards ===
More is renowned as the author of several studies that reset consensus on pollution standards for toxic metals worldwide, predicting the drop in air pollution that occurs during pandemic events three years before the COVID-19 pandemic. By showing that pollution levels dropped well below what scientists previously thought of as "natural levels" during pandemic events—when economic activity declines or ceases—More proved that no such "natural levels" of pollution exist. His research combined the highest resolution pollution and climate record for the last two millennia with highly detailed economic and epidemiological records. More pioneered this interdisciplinary work, using retrospective epidemiological (historical) data he sourced as well as ice core (from glaciers and ice sheets in the Northern Hemisphere and Arctic) data produced and analyzed by cutting-edge systems and a team under the guidance of Dr. Paul Andrew Mayewski at the Climate Change Institute. World renowned experts in lead pollution such as Philip J. Landrigan hailed More's research as revealing the true nature of modern pollution.

=== Consilience ===
More is a well-known proponent of scientific approaches that lead to consilience, a concept popularized by Harvard ecologist E. O. Wilson, which describes the convergence of multiple independent data sources to remove bias and represent a reality or solve a problem which would not be clear if only one discipline or type of data were used. More has adopted Wilson's methodology and applied it to his research, arguing that only this type of systems approach would be able to solve complex crises such as climate change and pandemics. He pioneered the transdisciplinary use of ultra-high-resolution climate data in combination with highly detailed retrospective epidemiological and economic (historical) data. More has also highlighted how consilience and systems dynamics predicted environmental and economic crises fairly accurately more than fifty years in advance.

=== First public health policies ===
More's research has uncovered the creation of the first government-sponsored public health and welfare system in western history, during an environmental crisis and on the eve of the second pandemic. Through extensive research he identified the site as the Republic of Venice, where sophisticated economic policies provided a continuous food supply with limited inflation, even during periods of extreme weather patterns (droughts, failed harvests, floods). In the same republic, broad public health measures guaranteed the safety of food as well as widespread access to medical care for the poor and all citizens. More demonstrated that the US Constitution contains clauses inspired by the same policies he uncovered, which were known to the framers.

=== Harvard MAPS ===
More is co-founder and co-managing editor of Harvard MAPS, an interactive digital atlas website that combines research data in environmental science, public health, economics, genomics, archaeoscience, and several other disciplines. The site receives over 1 million visitors per year and has been the source of several groundbreaking discoveries, including recurring pandemic hotspots, and areas of enduring prosperity, as well as enduring poverty.

== Awards and honors ==
In 2021, More was elected Fellow of Royal Society for Public Health and Fellow of the Royal Geographical Society. For his work in nature advocacy and conservation, particularly for marine protected areas (MPAs), he has been named a champion in Antarctica 2030, a coalition of leading global figures in policy, science and philanthropy. Upon his recruiting by Long Island University, he was elected Fellow of the Theodore Roosevelt Institute (2019-2022). In 2009, he became a junior Fellow of Harvard's Dumbarton Oaks Research Library and Collection. More is also a fellow of the Linnaean Society of New York and The Explorers Club of New York. As an active scientist in the fields of environmental health and climate science, More is a member of the American Public Health Association, the National Environmental Health Association, the American Geophysical Union, the Planetary health Alliance, and former member and UN Representative of the Global Council for Science and the Environment.

== Media ==
More appears frequently in TV and print media as a commentator and expert for climate and health stories. He and his research have been featured in news reports on CNN, The New York Times, The Washington Post, Forbes, Newsweek, The Times of London, The Guardian, Popular Science, National Geographic and many more outlets in several languages. Discovery Channel also dedicated an episode to him on their Discovery+ network. In his TED talk and other interviews, More has emphasized the crucial role of scientists and historian in engaging the public in their discoveries. More directs a program (CHCR) dedicated to climate and health science communication, funded by the Burroughs Wellcome Fund. The program offers fellowships to journalists who educate scientists on how to combat science misinformation and connect to news media more effectively. More has also partnered with the Pulitzer Center in making scientific data more accessible to journalists.

== Public service ==
More has served as a staff member in the office of Senator Ted Kennedy while he was drafting the Affordable Care Act. After Kennedy's passing, More continued serving under his replacement, Paul G. Kirk, in 2009-10. He declined an offer to continue serving under Scott Brown. As he discussed in several interviews, More pursued this unpaid position because he wanted the chance to work on the bill (ACA) that would grant Americans universal health care, a right and policy he has worked on throughout his career. Although an early version of the bill, drafted by Kennedy, did include an option for universal coverage, after his death this was removed. More worked on issues of immigration while serving in the Senate and continues to be an advocate for immigrants' rights, student loan forgiveness, universal health care, and climate action.

== Non-profit ==
More serves on several board of directors of non-profits, including the Daniels Family Sustainable Energy Foundation (Daniels Philanthropies), Blue Ocean Watch, Greenwater Foundation, and The Explorers Club (TEC). More chairs the program committee for Climate Week, at TEC, promoting cutting-edge scientific discoveries and partnerships between governments, scientists and the private sector. His sponsors and partners have included UNESCO, IUCN, Rolex, Pulitzer Center, XPRIZE, Prince Albert II of Monaco Foundation, African Parks, Nia Tero, Solutions Journalism Network, Mongabay, Woodwell Climate Research Center, and Discovery Channel. More has also led the organization of several global summits committing the participant nations and scientists to protecting ecosystem and human health in an endeavor to find solutions to climate and environmental change, as well as emerging epidemics.

== Main works ==
- More, Alexander F.; Gona, P. (2022). "Bacterial pathogens and Climate Change". The Lancet. 400 (10369): 2161–2163. doi:10.1016/S0140-6736(22)02424-2. PMID 36528366. S2CID 254705413.
- Yajima, R.; More, Alexander F.; Garvan, C.; Harper, C.; Grimes, K. V. (2022). "A US clinical trial network is needed for the next pandemic". Nature Medicine. 28 (7): 1330–1331. doi:10.1038/s41591-022-01831-1. PMID 35641823. S2CID 249236082.
- More, Alexander F. (2023). "aDNA Evidence of the Introduction of Infectious Diseases in the Americas". Les Nouvelles de l'Archéologie. 169: 69–75.
- More, Alexander F.; Loveluck, C. P.; Clifford, H.; Handley, M. J.; Korotkikh, E. V.; Kurbatov, A. V.; Mccormick, M.; Mayewski, P. A. (2020). "The Impact of a Six-Year Climate Anomaly on the 'Spanish Flu' Pandemic and WWI". GeoHealth. 4 (9) e2020GH000277. Bibcode:2020GHeal...4..277M. doi:10.1029/2020GH000277. PMC 7513628. PMID 33005839.
- More, Alexander. F.; Loveluck, C. P.; Clifford, H.; Handley, M. J.; Korotkikh, E. V.; Kurbatov, A. V.; Mccormick, M.; Mayewski, P. A. (2018). "The Role of Historical Context in Understanding Past Climate, Pollution and Health Data in Trans-disciplinary Studies". GeoHealth. 2 (5): 162–170. doi:10.1029/2017GH000121. PMC 7007076. PMID 32159523.
- More, Alexander F.; Loveluck, C. P.; Clifford, H.; Handley, M. J.; Korotkikh, E. V.; Kurbatov, A. V.; Mccormick, M.; Mayewski, P. A. (2017). "Next-generation ice core technology reveals true minimum natural levels of lead (Pb) in the atmosphere: Insights from the Black Death". GeoHealth. 1 (4): 211–219. Bibcode:2017GHeal...1..211M. doi:10.1002/2017GH000064. PMC 7007106. PMID 32158988.
- More, A. F. (2022). "Climate change at the turn of the millennium: new evidence from the consilience of natural and written records". Collège de France – CNRS Monographies. 57: 355–374.
- More, Alexander F.M. (2014). At the Origins of Welfare Policy. ProQuest 1625429280.

=== Selected editorials ===
More, Alexander F.; Mayewski, P. A.; Norchi, C. (November 1, 2020). "Why Climate Matters to Your Security, Health and Wealth". Journal of the North Atlantic and Arctic (also syndicated in Why Climate Matters and Global Geneva).

More, Alexander F.; Mayewski, P. A.; Norchi, C. (September 20, 2021). "The Hindu Kush Himalaya: An Endangered "Water Tower" in a Warming World". Why Climate Matters and Global Geneva.

== See also ==
- Lead poisoning
