= Statistical Rethinking =

Bayesian statistics textbook by Richard McElreath

Statistical Rethinking: A Bayesian Course with Examples in R and Stan
- Author: Richard McElreath
- Genre: Statistics
- Publisher: Chapman & Hall
- Publication date: December 21, 2015
- Pages: 487
- ISBN: 978-1-4822-5344-3

Statistical Rethinking: A Bayesian Course with Examples in R and Stan is an applied Bayesian statistics textbook by Richard McElreath.

A second edition of the book was published in 2020 with a considerable update to the text. This edition has more emphasis on using prior predictive simulation to understand prior distribution choices and illustrating additional statistical models (smoothing splines, robust regression, and models not within the generalized linear mixed model framework).

== Reception ==
Both editions of the book generally have positive reviews. A book review in the Journal of the Royal Statistical Society Series A: Statistics in Society comments that this is "an exceptional book". Although the book is directed at working researchers and advanced doctoral students, the review suggests that this book "deserves to be read carefully by a much wider audience even if it must be read from cover to cover". The reviewer ends by saying they would "unreservedly recommend this book to a wide audience interested in the principles of modern statistical modelling." The second edition of the book was reviewed in the Journal of Statistics Education and highlights McElreath's storytelling skills, exposition of the Bayesian material, and "colorful manner of providing intuition into the Bayesian concepts". The review concludes with saying the book is an "excellent introduction to modern applied Bayesian modeling" and is "a valuable resource for practitioners in the applied sciences".

One concern from the review in the Journal of Statistics Education highlights the lack of mathematical rigor a doctoral student in statistics may need in developing Bayesian methodology and the reliance on the author's rethinking R package.

== Awards ==
- 2023 DeGroot Prize by the International Society for Bayesian Analysis (ISBA)

== Publication history ==
- McElreath, Richard (December 21, 2015). Statistical Rethinking: A Bayesian Course with Examples in R and Stan (1st ed.). Chapman & Hall. doi:10.1201/9781315372495. ISBN 978-1-4822-5344-3. OL 20743446W.
- McElreath, Richard (March 16, 2020). Statistical Rethinking: A Bayesian Course with Examples in R and STAN (2nd ed.). New York. doi:10.1201/9780429029608. ISBN 978-0-367-13991-9. OCLC 1145123627. OL 28056868M.
