= Matthias Meyer =

German geneticist

- Scientific career
- Fields: Biochemist; Geneticist
- Institutions: Max Planck Institute for Evolutionary Anthropology
- Doctoral advisors: Michael Hofreiter
- Notable students: Marie-Theres Gansauge
- Website: www.eva.mpg.de/genetics/advanced-dna-sequencing-techniques/overview.html

Matthias Meyer is a German evolutionary geneticist working primarily with ancient DNA. Meyer is the leader of the Advanced DNA sequencing techniques group at the Max Planck Institute for Evolutionary Anthropology.

== Research ==
Meyer has developed methods that have improved the scope of DNA sequencing, including methods for indexing of sequencing libraries of double-stranded DNA and extraction of highly degraded DNA from sediments. His work has been instrumental for the generation of the first high-quality genome sequences from archaic humans as well as the recovery of the oldest DNA sequences known to date from fossils not discovered in permafrost.
