= Hugo Zeberg =

Swedish physician and academic

- Occupations: Physician and academic
- Awards: Daiwa Adrian Prize Award, Daiwa Anglo-Japanese Foundation; Sven and Ebba-Christina Hagberg Prize

Academic background
- Education: M.D. Ph.D.
- Alma mater: Karolinska Institutet
- Thesis: Conductance-based principles of neuronal firing and excitability

Hugo Zeberg is a Swedish physician and academic. He is an assistant professor in the Department of Physiology and Pharmacology at Karolinska Institutet.

Zeberg is most known for his research on evolutionary genetics, focusing on gene flow from Neandertals and Denisovans into modern humans. He has also conducted research studies on genetic variability and its functional impact, especially on membrane-bound proteins like receptors and ion channels. In 2020, he identified Neanderthal genes that can influence how ill different people become after contracting the COVID-19 virus while working with Svante Pääbo. He is the recipient of the 2022 Sven and Ebba-Christina Hagberg Prize.

Since 2014, Zeberg has been serving as the president of the Swedish Society for Anatomy and a consulting editor for anatomy textbooks and atlases at Georg Thieme Verlag.

== Education ==
Zeberg obtained his Doctor of Medicine degree from Karolinska Institutet with research training in 2013. He also received his Ph.D. in electrophysiology and computational neuroscience from the same institute.

== Career ==
Zeberg started his academic career in 2015 as a lecturer at Karolinska Institutet. He was appointed as a Registered Medical Practitioner in 2016. From 2017 until 2019 he served as a postdoctoral researcher at the Max-Planck-Institute for Evolutionary Anthropology in Leipzig. Since 2019, he has been holding an appointment as an assistant professor at Karolinska Institutet.

== Research ==
Zeberg's primary research focus lies in evolutionary genetics and biology, particularly in the areas of gene flow from Neandertals and Denisovans into modern humans, and its impact on health and disease. Additionally, through the application of both bioinformatics and functional studies, his research has also focused on areas such as pharmacogenetics and genetic predisposition to infectious diseases, including COVID-19.

=== Media coverage ===
Zeberg and Svante Pääbo discovered a gene inherited from Neanderthals that is linked to an increased risk of severe COVID-19; this work has been featured in news outlets, such as The New York Times, BBC Science Focus, Bloomberg, ScienceDaily, and Medical News Today. His solo subsequent work on the COVID-19 risk variant, which was found to reduce a person's risk of contracting HIV by 27%, has been covered by Contagion Live, and EurekAlert.

=== Genetic factors in COVID-19 severity ===
Zeberg has conducted research studies on how gene variants inherited from Neanderthals influence occurrence of severe complications from Covid-19. He has also worked with Svante Pääbo for years and published a collaborative study in the journal Nature in 2020, providing evidence suggesting a role for genetics in the severity of COVID-19. He identified a 50-kilobase genomic region inherited from Neanderthals on chromosome 3 as the primary genetic risk factor for severe SARS-CoV-2 symptoms. It was further established that the variant is associated with a 60% increased likelihood of hospitalization and impacts approximately 50% of individuals in South Asia and around 16% in Europe. After identifying this genetic risk factor, he, in collaboration with Pääbo, observed a notable increase in its frequency since the last ice age during spring 2021. This unexpected commonality led them to suggest that it might have conferred a positive effect on carriers in earlier times. He conducted research on whether this genetic factor might even provide protection against other infectious diseases and revealed in the subsequent solo study published in PNAS that risk variant offers protection against getting infected with HIV.

Under the COVID-19 Host Genetics Initiative, Zeberg investigated the role of human genetics in SARS-CoV-2 infection and COVID-19 severity. He also expanded upon genetic factors linked to severe COVID-19, unveiling a novel Neandertal haplotype on chromosome 12 with protective effects against the virus, in contrast to a previously identified Neandertal haplotype associated with increased disease risk. Additionally, his joint work identified a Neanderthal isoform of OAS1 that protects individuals of European ancestry against COVID-19 susceptibility and severity.

Within the context of pharmacogenomics, Zeberg discovered a Neanderthal-inherited DNA region containing two cytochrome P450 enzymes in a joint study, revealing that this haplotype encodes proteins crucial for RNA virus infection responses. The research also established that these enzymes are involved in the metabolism of widely used medications like warfarin and phenytoin.

=== Neural science ===
Zeberg conducted research in the field of Neural Science to explore the mechanisms and dynamics of neural activity and their impact on cognitive processes. He has contributed to the understanding of normal as well as pathological brain function and studied the inherent dynamics of different neuron types and their interplay with network activity to examine the complex processes. To investigate the stability of patterns of gamma oscillation in the cortex, he and his collaborators injected artificial synaptic conductances into FS cells and measured the phase resetting produced by synaptic inputs.

== Awards and honors ==
- 2010 – Daiwa Adrian Prize Award, Daiwa Anglo-Japanese Foundation
- 2022 – Sven and Ebba-Christina Hagberg Prize
- 2024 – The Florman award, Royal Swedish Academy of Sciences

== Bibliography ==
=== Edited books ===
- THIEME Atlas of Anatomy: General Anatomy and Musculoskeletal System (2015) ISBN 978-1604069228
- THIEME Atlas of Anatomy: Internal Organs (2016) ISBN 978-1626231672
- THIEME Atlas of Anatomy: Head, Neck, and Neuroanatomy (2016) 978-1626231696
- THIEME Atlas of Anatomy Latin Nomenclature: Fourth Edition (2021) ISBN 978-1684204519

=== Selected articles ===
- Zeberg, H., & Pääbo, S. (2020). The major genetic risk factor for severe COVID-19 is inherited from Neanderthals. Nature, 587(7835), 610-612.
- Zeberg, H., & Pääbo, S. (2021). A genomic region associated with protection against severe COVID-19 is inherited from Neandertals. Proceedings of the National Academy of Sciences, 118(9), e2026309118.
- Zhou, S., Butler-Laporte, G., Nakanishi, T., Morrison, D. R., Afilalo, J., Afilalo, M., ... & Richards, J. B. (2021). A Neanderthal OAS1 isoform protects individuals of European ancestry against COVID-19 susceptibility and severity. Nature medicine, 27(4), 659-667.
- COVID-19 Host Genetics Initiative. (2021). Mapping the human genetic architecture of COVID-19. Nature, 600(7889), 472-477.
- Kousathanas, A., Pairo-Castineira, E., Rawlik, K., Stuckey, A., Odhams, C. A., Walker, S., ... & Peterborough City Hospital team Butcher Deborah 153 154 O'Sullivan Susie 153 154 Butterworth-Cowin Nicola 153 154. (2022). Whole-genome sequencing reveals host factors underlying critical COVID-19. Nature, 607(7917), 97-103.
