= Initiative for the Science of the Human Past at Harvard =

US research project

The Initiative for the Science of the Human Past at Harvard (SoHP) is a trans-disciplinary research endeavor aimed at combining next-generation technology and scientific research with established methods of historical investigation. The Initiative currently sponsors four major projects:

1. The History of Climate Change (historical ice core project), in collaboration with the Climate Change Institute (University of Maine).
2. The Max Planck Harvard Research Center for the Archaeoscience of the Ancient Mediterranean (MHAAM), in collaboration with the Max Planck Institute for the Science of Human History.
3. The Isotopic Silk Road.
4. The Digital Atlas of Roman and Medieval Civilizations (DARMC) combining highly detailed data from researchers worldwide.

== Aim ==
SoHP addresses long-standing questions that have eluded historians and archaeologists due to lack of evidence. SoHP members combine new technologies and scientific research to produce large amounts of data about the past to take advantage of the potential of interdisciplinary work. The Initiative's publications have so far shed light on topics of current as well as historical relevance, such as the spread and evolution of the deadly epidemics (e.g. Yersinia pestis); the accurate level of man-made lead pollution in the air and trade and migration patterns across Eurasia and the Mediterranean.

== Committee ==
The steering committee of the Initiative includes: Thomas Benjamin, Joyce Chaplin, Peter Huybers, Michael McCormick (Chair), Laura Nasrallah, Nick Patterson, David Pilbeam, David Reich, Stuart Shieber, Dan Smail, Christina Warriner, Jason Ur, Walter Willett. The initiative sponsors postdoctoral fellowships for outstanding interdisciplinary scholars in the new fields of archaeoscience, health history and climate history. The current postdoctoral fellow is Alexander F. More who is also Assistant Research Professor at the Climate Change Institute.

SoHP has also started sponsoring a PhD in archaeoscience, selecting candidates at a yearly symposium held at Harvard University during the fall semester. Candidates are selected from all over the world.
