= Kirsten Bos =

Canadian physical anthropologist

- Education: University of Guelph; University of Manitoba; McMaster University
- Known for: Genetic research on the plague
- Scientific career
- Fields: Paleopathology physical anthropology
- Workplaces: Max Planck Institute for Evolutionary Anthropology
- Doctoral advisor: Hendrik Poinar
- Website: kirstenbos.ca

Kirsten Bos is a Canadian physical anthropologist. She is Group Leader of Molecular Palaeopathology at the Max Planck Institute for Evolutionary Anthropology in Leipzig. Her research focuses on ancient DNA and infectious diseases.

== Education ==
Bos obtained a BS in Bio-Medical Science from the University of Guelph in 2001. The following year, she studied Anthropology at the University of Manitoba. She received an MA in Anthropology at McMaster University in 2004, and earned a PhD in 2012. Her thesis title was Genetic investigations into the Black Death. From 2012 to 2015, Bos was a postdoctoral researcher at the University of Tübingen.

== Research ==
=== Plague ===
Bos began researching plague as a member of the McMaster University Ancient DNA Centre. Bos and Verena Schuenemann of the University of Tübingen, led a research project, co-sponsored by the McMaster Ancient DNA Centre and the University of Tübingen, to sequence the DNA of the Black Death pathogen, Yersinia pestis, recovered from plague victims at a medieval London burial site. The archaeological excavation of the plague cemetery was managed by the Museum of London Archaeology.

After examining bacterial samples from 46 teeth and 53 bones, the research team was able to establish that Yersinia pestis was the cause of Black Death, which killed over 30 million people in 14th century Europe. The team also determined that the ancient pathogen is the predecessor of all modern variants of plague and the medieval bacteria hasn't changed much since the Middle Ages. The team's findings were published in the journal Nature in December, 2011.

=== Ancient tuberculosis ===
Bos led a recent study, which discovered that an ancient strain of tuberculosis (TB) migrated to the New World by infected sea lions and seals. The research team from the University of Tübingen, examined thousands of skeletons for TB, and were able to extract (TB) DNA from three skeletons uncovered in southern Peru. It was determined that the remains were buried 1,000 years ago, before the arrival of Europeans to the New World. The researchers also established that the ancient TB was different from modern tuberculosis bacterium.

The study results, which were published in the journal Nature in October, 2014, proposed that a new strain of TB, dissimilar to TB strains that were in existence throughout the world 1,000 years ago, had migrated to South America. Researchers came to the conclusion that the ancient Peruvian form of TB was almost identical to TB strains identified in pinnipeds–a group that includes seals, sea lions and walruses. The study's results indicate that TB emerged in Africa approximately 6,000 years ago and the TB bacterium moved from land animals to a sea lion or seal, which then traveled across the ocean to the South America. The sea animals, at some point, probably infected people living in coastal Peru and northern Chile.

== Selected publications ==
- Bos, Kirsten; et al. (2017). "Mining Metagenomic Data Sets for Ancient DNA: Recommended Protocols for Authentication". Trends in Genetics. 33 (8): 508–520. doi:10.1016/j.tig.2017.05.005. PMID 28688671.
- Bos, Kirsten; et al. (2016). "Historical Y. pestis Genomes Reveal the European Black Death as the Source of Ancient and Modern Plague Pandemics". Cell Host & Microbe. 19 (6): 874–881. doi:10.1016/j.chom.2016.05.012. PMID 27281573.
- Bos, Kirsten; et al. (2014). "Pre-Columbian mycobacterial genomes reveal seals as a source of New World human tuberculosis". Nature. 514 (7523): 494–497. Bibcode:2014Natur.514..494B. doi:10.1038/nature13591. PMC 4550673. PMID 25141181.
- Bos, Kirsten; et al. (2013). "A revised timescale for human evolution based on ancient mitochondrial genomes". Biology. 23 (7): 553–559. doi:10.1016/j.cub.2013.02.044. PMC 5036973. PMID 23523248.
- Bos, Kirsten; et al. (2011). "A draft genome of Yersinia pestis from victims of the Black Death". Nature. 478 (7370): 506–510. Bibcode:2011Natur.478..506B. doi:10.1038/nature10549. PMC 3690193. PMID 21993626.
