= Richard McElreath =

American anthropologist and statistician (born 1973)

- Born: 18 April 1973 (age 53); Landstuhl, West Germany
- Education: Emory University (BS); University of California, Los Angeles (PhD)
- Scientific career
- Fields: Evolutionary anthropology
- Workplaces: Max Planck Institute for Evolutionary Anthropology
- Thesis: Culture and ecology of Usangu, Tanzania (2001)
- Doctoral advisor: Robert Boyd
- Website: xcelab.net/rm/

Richard McElreath (born 18 April 1973) is an American statistician and evolutionary anthropologist. He is Director of the Department of Human Behavior, Ecology and Culture at the Max Planck Institute for Evolutionary Anthropology (MPI EVA) in Leipzig, Germany, as well as Professor of Human Evolutionary Ecology at Leipzig University. He is an author of the Statistical Rethinking applied Bayesian statistics textbook, among the first to largely rely on the Stan statistical environment, and the accompanying rethinking R language package.

== Education ==
McElreath earned his B.S. at Emory University in 1995 and his Ph.D. in anthropology at the University of California, Los Angeles in 2001 under the anthropologist Robert Boyd, performing field research in Tanzania.

== Career ==
From 2001 to 2002, he did a postdoctoral fellowship at the Max Planck Institute for Human Development in Berlin, Germany, studying bounded rationality under the German psychologist Gerd Gigerenzer. In 2002, he joined the faculty at the University of California, Davis in the Department of Anthropology as Assistant Professor, promoting to Associate Professor in 2006 and full Professor in 2014, and was chair of the department that year. From 2015 to 2018 he jointly held in his current directorship at the MPI EVA and Professorship at UC Davis. In 2018, he was appointed Honorary Professor at Leipzig University as part of his Directorship at the nearby MPI EVA, which is affiliated with the university.

== Research ==
McElreath's main research focus is cultural evolution and human behavioral ecology and culture, particularly the application of statistical modeling such as Bayesian inference to these areas. He also researches the social dynamics of the replication crisis in science and contributes to university statistical education. He has been outspoken in popular media about the current incentive and grant systems in scientific funding.

== Selected publications ==
=== Books ===
- McElreath, Richard; Boyd, Robert (2007). Mathematical Models of Social Evolution: A Guide for the Perplexed. The University of Chicago Press. ISBN 978-0-226-55827-1.
- McElreath, Richard (2015). Statistical Rethinking: A Bayesian Course with Examples in R and Stan (1st ed.). Chapman & Hall (published December 21, 2015). doi:10.1201/9781315372495. ISBN 978-1-4822-5344-3.
- McElreath, Richard (2020). Statistical Rethinking: A Bayesian Course with Examples in R and STAN (2nd ed.). New York (published March 16, 2020). doi:10.1201/9780429029608. ISBN 978-0-367-13991-9.

=== Articles and chapters ===
- Henrich, Joseph, Robert Boyd, Samuel Bowles, Colin Camerer, Ernst Fehr, Herbert Gintis, and Richard McElreath. "In search of homo economicus: behavioral experiments in 15 small-scale societies." American Economic Review 91, no. 2 (2001): 73–78.
- Henrich, Joseph, Richard McElreath, Abigail Barr, Jean Ensminger, Clark Barrett, Alexander Bolyanatz, Juan Camilo Cardenas et al. "Costly punishment across human societies." Science 312, no. 5781 (2006): 1767–1770.
- Henrich, Joseph, Jean Ensminger, Richard McElreath, Abigail Barr, Clark Barrett, Alexander Bolyanatz, Juan Camilo Cardenas et al. "Markets, religion, community size, and the evolution of fairness and punishment." Science 327, no. 5972 (2010): 1480–1484.
- Henrich, Joseph, and Richard McElreath. "The evolution of cultural evolution." Evolutionary Anthropology: Issues, News, and Reviews: Issues, News, and Reviews 12, no. 3 (2003): 123–135.
- Dawes, Christopher T., James H. Fowler, Tim Johnson, Richard McElreath, and Oleg Smirnov. "Egalitarian motives in humans." Nature 446, no. 7137 (2007): 794.

== See also ==
- Stan (software)
