= DNASE1L1 =

Protein-coding gene in humans

Identifiers
- Aliases: DNASE1L1, DNAS1L1, DNASEX, DNL1L, G4.8, XIB, deoxyribonuclease I-like 1, deoxyribonuclease 1 like 1
- External IDs: OMIM: 300081; MGI: 109628; HomoloGene: 4896; GeneCards: DNASE1L1; OMA:DNASE1L1 - orthologs

Gene location (Human)
Chr.	X chromosome (human)
Band	Xq28	Start	154,401,236 bp
Band	Xq28	End	154,412,112 bp

Gene location (Mouse)
Chr.	X chromosome (mouse)
Band	X A7.3|X 37.94 cM	Start	73,316,823 bp
Band	X A7.3|X 37.94 cM	End	73,325,943 bp
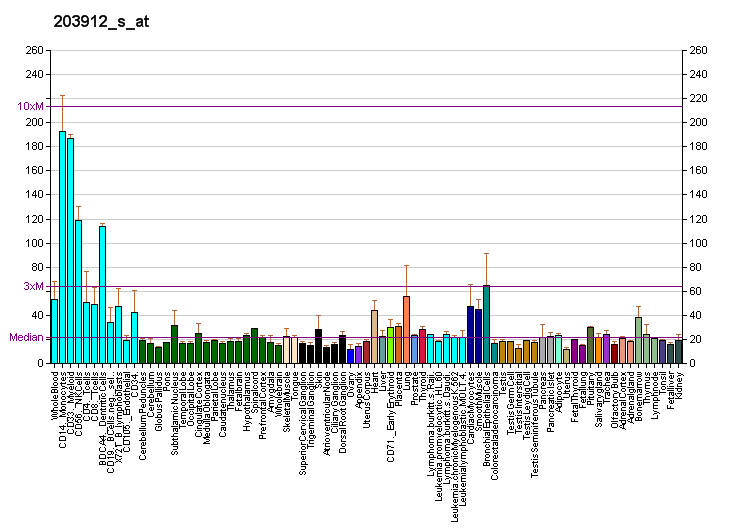
RNA expression pattern
Bgee	Human / Mouse (ortholog); Top expressed in: muscle of thigh; gastrocnemius muscle; glutes; Skeletal muscle tissue of biceps brachii; Skeletal muscle tissue of rectus abdominis; vastus lateralis muscle; apex of heart; stromal cell of endometrium; triceps brachii muscle; tendon of biceps brachii / Top expressed in: quadriceps femoris muscle; muscle of thigh; skeletal muscle tissue; bone marrow; zone of skin; esophagus; duodenum; granulocyte; lip; colon; More reference expression data
BioGPS	More reference expression data
Gene ontology
Molecular function	DNA binding; nuclease activity; endonuclease activity; hydrolase activity; deoxyribonuclease activity; deoxyribonuclease I activity
Cellular component	endoplasmic reticulum; extracellular region; specific granule lumen; nucleus
Biological process	DNA metabolic process; DNA catabolic process; nucleic acid phosphodiester bond hydrolysis; neutrophil degranulation; DNA catabolic process, endonucleolytic
Sources:Amigo / QuickGO
Orthologs
Species	Human	Mouse
Entrez	1774	69537
Ensembl	ENSG00000013563	ENSMUSG00000019088
UniProt	P49184	Q9D7J6
RefSeq (mRNA)	NM_001009932; NM_001009933; NM_001009934; NM_001303620; NM_006730	NM_001172154; NM_027109; NM_001370787
RefSeq (protein)	NP_001009932; NP_001009933; NP_001009934; NP_001290549; NP_006721	NP_001165625; NP_081385; NP_001357716
Location (UCSC)	Chr X: 154.4 – 154.41 Mb	Chr X: 73.32 – 73.33 Mb
PubMed search
- Wikidata
View/Edit Human	View/Edit Mouse

Deoxyribonuclease-1-like 1 is an enzyme that in humans is encoded by the DNASE1L1 gene. It is also known as DNaseX due to its localisation on the X chromosome.

This gene encodes a member of the deoxyribonuclease family and the protein and DNA shows high sequence similarity to lysosomal DNase I. Alternate transcriptional splice variants, encoding the same protein, have been characterized.

The DNase1L1/DNaseX gene was discovered in the early 1990s by Johannes F. Coy as a member of the Molecular Genome Analysis research project at the DKFZ (German Cancer Research Center) in Heidelberg and first published in 1996.

Just like the DNase I enzyme produced by the DNase I gene, the DNase1L1 (DNaseX) enzyme produced by the DNase1L1 (DNaseX) gene cuts double-stranded deoxyribonucleic acid (DNA) molecular chains into pieces. The cutting of DNA into 300-base pair pieces represents the final step in the execution of programmed cell death (apoptosis). Cells can then no longer perform cell division and thus cannot develop into tumor cells. DNase I and DNase1L1 (DNaseX) carry out programmed cell death (apoptosis) and thus protect the human body from the development of tumor cells. Conversely, the absence of DNase enzyme activity leads to the increased formation of tumor cells, as the execution of apoptosis is prevented.

== Importance ==
A fundamental common feature of all tumors is the disruption of apoptosis. Degenerated cells thus evade self-destruction, continue to grow and carry the risk of further degeneration through further mutations and increase in aggressiveness and malignancy.

DNaseX (DNase1L1) has a special feature that makes it suitable as a marker for the detection of cancer. The concentration of the DNaseX enzyme increases in tumor cells - in contrast to other DNases, whose concentration decreases in the course of tumor development.

DNaseX is generally produced in greater quantities in tumor cells in order to induce the desired programmed cell death. However, by synthesizing specific inhibitors, the tumor cell can suppress the enzyme activity of DNaseX and thus prevent the final apoptosis step, the DNA cutting.

The accumulation of DNaseX has been detected in all premalignant and malignant tumor types examined to date. The accumulation in cells occurs when DNaseX cannot fulfill its task. Then the cell continues to produce the DNaseX protein because it wants to induce apoptosis. This situation leads to higher and higher concentrations of DNaseX in the cell. If a DNaseX overproduction can be detected, this can be taken as an indicator of impaired apoptosis and as an indication of the development of tumors in the body.

The Apo10 epitope plays a special role in this process. This characteristic section of the protein sequence of the DNaseX enzyme can be identified diagnostically using the same-named monoclonal antibody Apo10 (DJ28D4).

The resulting accumulation of DNaseX (Apo10) in the nucleus also makes the detection easier - since the amount of Apo10 in the nucleus increases sharply.

== Clinical application ==
DNaseX (Apo10) is already applied in diagnostic cancer screening. The enzymes DNaseX (Apo10) and TKTL1 are detected in PanTum Detect, a blood test used in combination with imaging techniques such as MRI and PET-CT for the early detection of cancer. The detection of DNaseX (Apo10) and TKTL1 in immune cells using EDIM technology provides clues to possible tumor disease. In case of an abnormal result, clarification by imaging techniques is recommended.
