= Svante Pääbo =

Swedish geneticist (born 1955)

Svante Pääbo ForMemRS KmstkNO
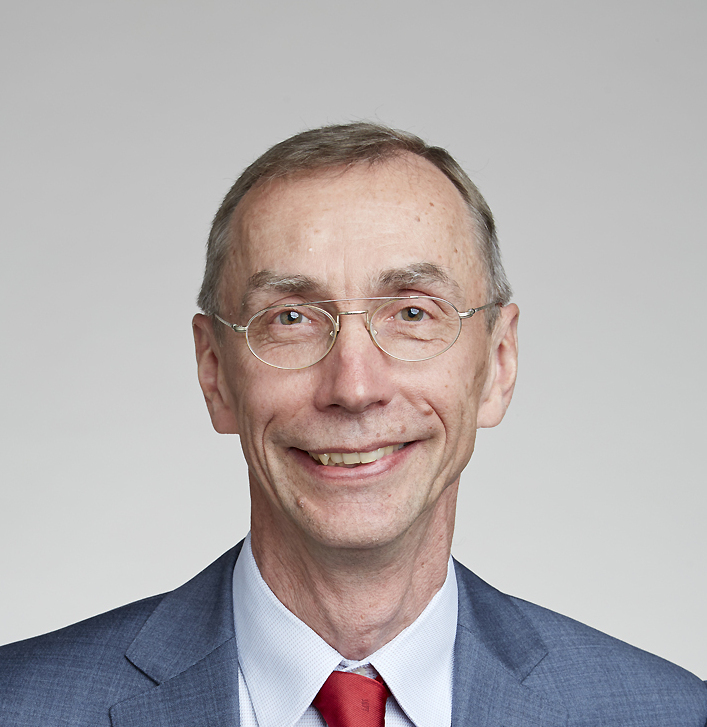
- Pääbo in 2016
- Born: 20 April 1955 (age 71); Stockholm, Sweden
- Education: Uppsala University (PhD)
- Known for: Paleogenetics
- Spouse: Linda Vigilant (m. 2008)
- Children: 2
- Relatives: Sune Bergström (father)
- Awards: Gottfried Wilhelm Leibniz Prize (1992); Max Delbrück Medal (1998); Louis-Jeantet Prize for Medicine (2005); Pour le Mérite (2008); Kistler Prize (2009); Great Cross of Merit with star (2009); Gruber Prize in Genetics (2013); Lomonosov Gold Medal (2014); Breakthrough Prize in Life Sciences (2016); Keio Medical Science Prize (2016); Princess of Asturias Award (2018); Körber European Science Prize (2018); Darwin–Wallace Medal (2019); Japan Prize (2020); Massry Prize (2021); Nobel Prize in Physiology or Medicine (2022); Commander Grand Cross of the Order of the Polar Star (2024)
- Scientific career
- Fields: Genetics; Evolutionary anthropology
- Workplaces: Max Planck Institute for Evolutionary Anthropology, Leipzig; Leipzig University; Okinawa Institute of Science and Technology; LMU Munich; University of California, Berkeley; University of Zurich
- Thesis: How the E19 Protein of Adenoviruses Modulates the Immune System (1986)

Svante Pääbo (Swedish: [ˈsvânːtɛ̂ ˈpʰɛ̌ːbʊ̂]; born 20 April 1955) is a Swedish geneticist and Nobel Laureate who specialises in the field of evolutionary genetics. As one of the founders of paleogenetics, he has worked extensively on the Neanderthal genome. In 1997, he became founding director of the Department of Genetics at the Max Planck Institute for Evolutionary Anthropology in Leipzig, Germany. Since 1999, he has been an honorary professor at Leipzig University; he currently teaches molecular evolutionary biology at the university. He is also an adjunct professor at Okinawa Institute of Science and Technology, Japan.

In 2022, he was awarded the Nobel Prize in Physiology or Medicine "for his discoveries concerning the genomes of extinct hominins and human evolution".

== Education and early life ==
Pääbo was born in Stockholm, Sweden, in 1955 and grew up there with his mother, Estonian chemist Karin Pääbo (Estonian: [ˈpæːpo]; 1925–2013), who had escaped from the Soviet invasion in 1944 and arrived in Sweden as a refugee during World War II. He was born through an extramarital affair of his father, Swedish biochemist Sune Bergström (1916–2004), who, like his son, became a recipient of the Nobel Prize in Physiology or Medicine (in 1982). Pääbo is his mother's only child; he has via his father's marriage a half-brother, Rurik Reenstierna (also born in 1955), who only learned Svante was his brother in 2004.

Pääbo later described his childhood as:

First of all, I grew up as a single child of a single mum. Our father only visited us on Saturdays for a few hours. I think my mum was a very strong woman who took my interest seriously too. When I got interested in runic stones, we would on Saturdays and Sundays drive around and look at runic stones around Stockholm and I would measure them and copy the runes. She really took time to sort of nurture those interests.

Pääbo grew up as a native Swedish speaker. In a 2012 interview with the Estonian newspaper Eesti Päevaleht, he said that he self-identifies as a Swede, but has a "special relationship with Estonia".

In 1975, Pääbo began studying at Uppsala University, serving one year in the Swedish Defense Forces attached to the School of Interpreters. Pääbo earned his Ph.D. from Uppsala University in 1986 for research investigating how the E19 protein of adenoviruses modulates the immune system.

== Research and career ==
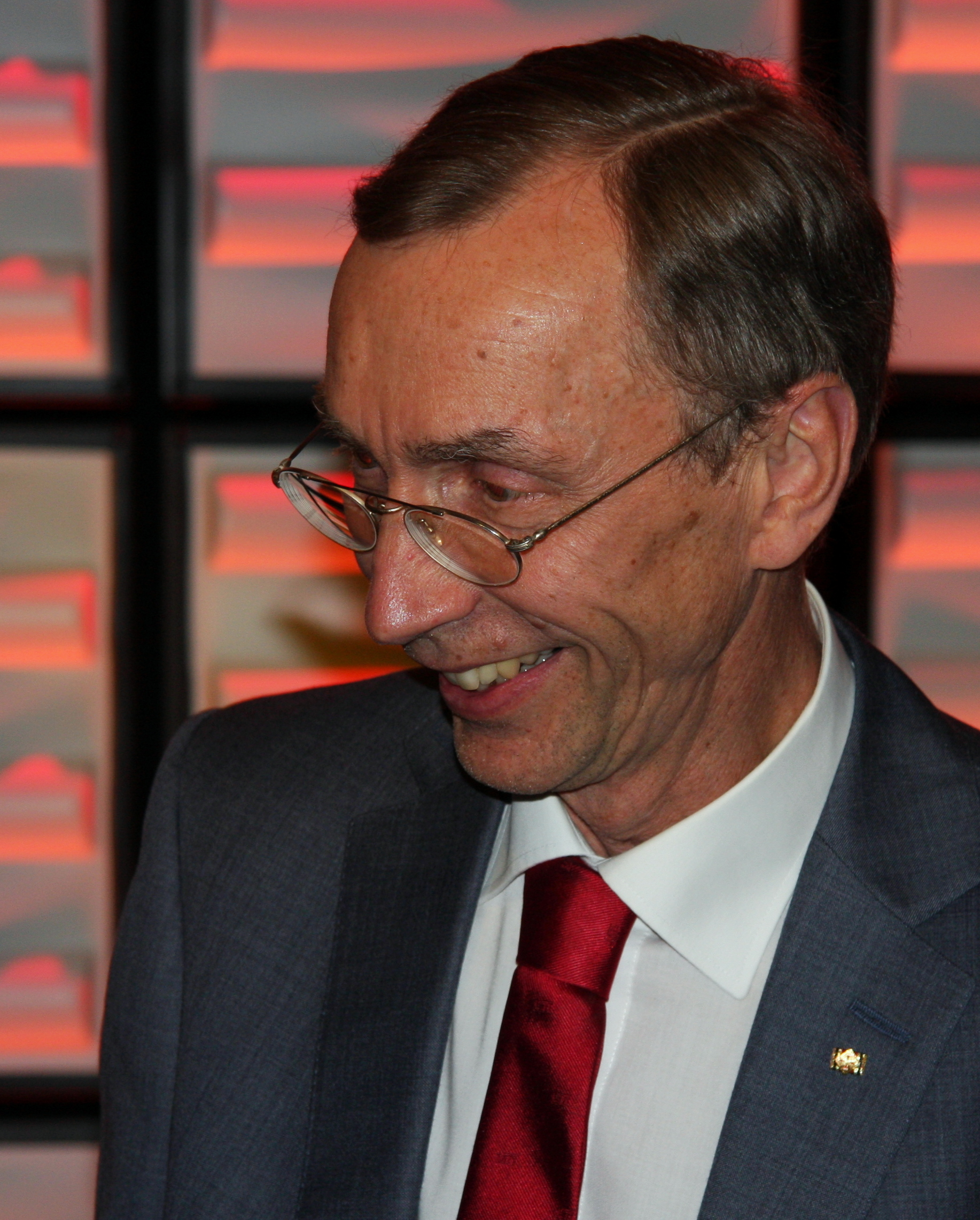
Pääbo at the 2014 Nobel Conference

Pääbo is known as one of the founders of paleogenetics, a discipline that uses genetics to study early humans and other ancient species.

From 1986 to 1987, he did postdoctoral research at the Institute for Molecular Biology II, University of Zurich, Switzerland.

As an EMBO Postdoctoral Fellow, Pääbo moved to the United States in 1987, accepting a position as a postdoctoral researcher in biochemistry at the University of California, Berkeley, where he joined Allan Wilson's lab and worked on the genome of extinct mammals.

In 1990, he returned to Europe to become professor of general biology at LMU Munich, and, in 1997, he became founding director of the Max Planck Institute for Evolutionary Anthropology in Leipzig, Germany.

In 1997, Pääbo and colleagues reported their successful sequencing of Neanderthal mitochondrial DNA (mtDNA), originating from a specimen found in Feldhofer grotto in the Neander valley.

In August 2002, Pääbo's department published findings about the "language gene", FOXP2, which is mutated in some individuals with language disabilities.

In 2006, Pääbo announced a plan to reconstruct the entire genome of Neanderthals. In 2007, he was named one of Time magazine's 100 most influential people of the year.

In February 2009, at the Annual Meeting of the American Association for the Advancement of Science (AAAS) in Chicago, it was announced that the Max Planck Institute for Evolutionary Anthropology had completed the first draft version of the Neanderthal genome. Over 3 billion base pairs were sequenced in collaboration with the 454 Life Sciences Corporation.

In March 2010, Pääbo and his coworkers published a report about the DNA analysis of a finger bone found in the Denisova Cave in Siberia; the results suggest that the bone belonged to an extinct member of the genus Homo that had not yet been recognised, the Denisova hominin. Pääbo first wanted to classify the Denisovans as a species of their own, separate from modern humans and Neanderthals but changed his mind after peer-review. In this context, Svante Pääbo was able to show that the TKTL1 gene discovered by Johannes F. Coy has a single amino acid substitution in Neanderthals compared to modern humans. This change probably influenced neuronal development and may have contributed to the difference in brain structure between Neanderthals and Homo sapiens.

In May 2010, Pääbo and his colleagues published a draft sequence of the Neanderthal genome in the journal Science. He and his team also concluded that there was probably interbreeding between Neanderthals and Eurasian (but not Sub-Saharan African) humans. There is general mainstream support in the scientific community for this theory of interbreeding between archaic and modern humans. This admixture of modern human and Neanderthal genes is estimated to have occurred roughly between 50,000 and 60,000 years ago, in the Middle East.

In 2014, he published the book Neanderthal Man: In Search of Lost Genomes where he, in the mixed form of a memoir and popular science, tells the story of the research effort to map the Neanderthal genome combined with his thoughts on human evolution.

In 2020, Hugo Zeberg and Svante Pääbo determined that more severe impacts upon victims of the COVID-19 disease, including the vulnerability to it and the incidence of the necessity of hospitalisation, have been associated via DNA analysis to be expressed in genetic variants at chromosomal region 3, features that are associated with European Neanderthal heritage. That structure imposes greater risks that those affected will develop a more severe form of the disease. The findings were described in a Nature article with Hugo Zeberg from Karolinska Institutet and Svante Pääbo from the Max Planck Institute.

As of October 2022, Pääbo has an h-index of 167 according to Google Scholar and of 133 according to Scopus.

=== Awards and honours ===
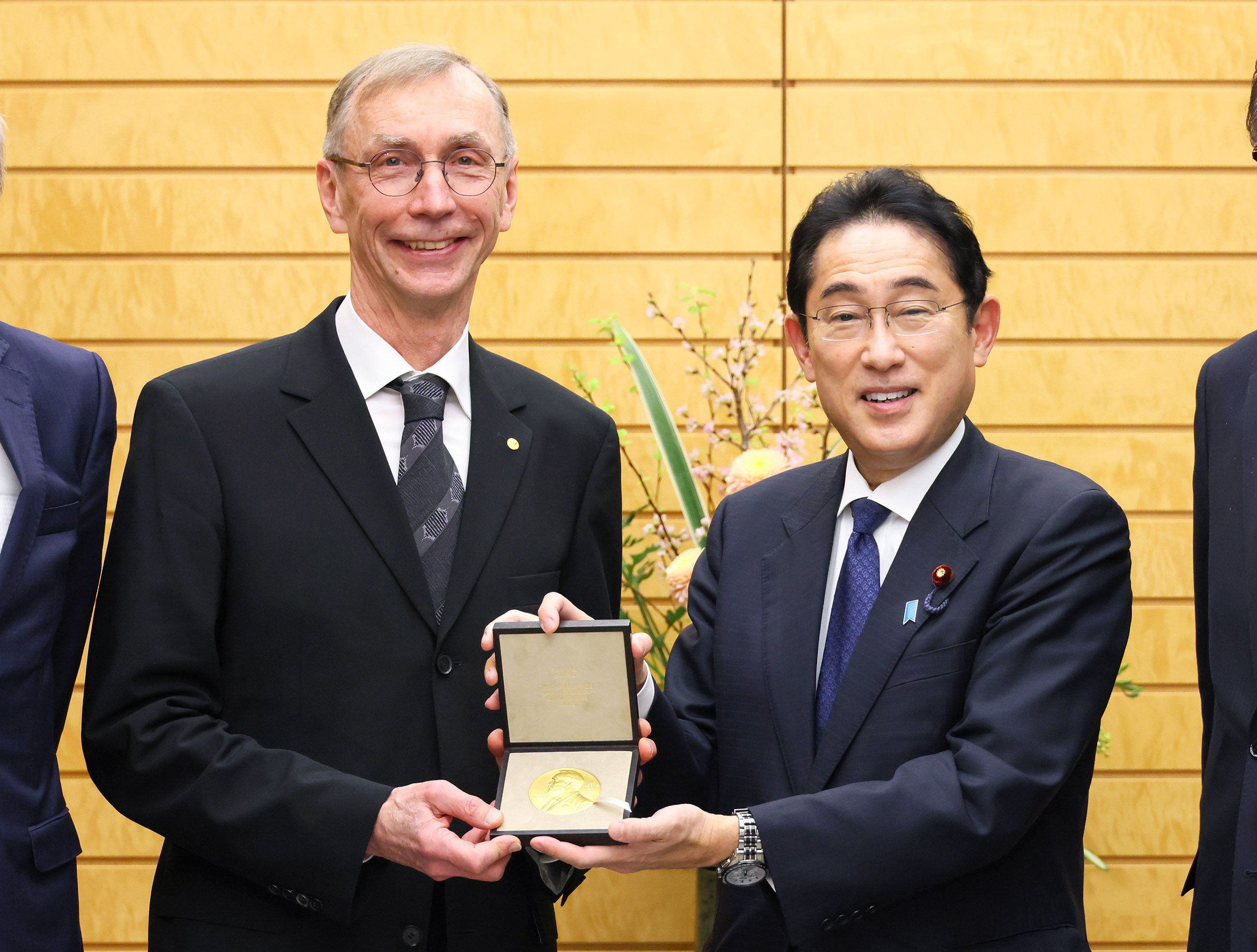
Pääbo showed the medal of Nobel Prize in Physiology or Medicine to Fumio Kishida (1 February 2023).

In 1992, he received the Gottfried Wilhelm Leibniz Prize of the Deutsche Forschungsgemeinschaft, which is the highest honour awarded in German research. Pääbo was elected a member of the Royal Swedish Academy of Sciences in 2000, and in 2004 was elected an international member of the National Academy of Sciences. He received the Ernst Schering Prize in 2003. In 2005, he received the prestigious Louis-Jeantet Prize for Medicine. In 2008, Pääbo was added to the members of the Order Pour le Mérite for Sciences and Arts. In the same year, he received the Golden Plate Award of the American Academy of Achievement. In October 2009, the Foundation For the Future announced that Pääbo had been awarded the 2009 Kistler Prize for his work isolating and sequencing ancient DNA, beginning in 1984 with a 2,400-year-old mummy. In June 2010, the Federation of European Biochemical Societies (FEBS) awarded him the Theodor Bücher Medal for outstanding achievements in Biochemistry and Molecular Biology. In 2013, he received Gruber Prize in Genetics for groundbreaking research in evolutionary genetics. In 2014, Pääbo was awarded the Swedish sv:Learning Ladder Prize. In June 2015, he was awarded the degree of DSc (honoris causa) at NUI Galway. He was elected a Foreign Member of the Royal Society in 2016, and in 2017, was awarded the Dan David Prize. In 2018, he received the Princess of Asturias Awards in the category of Scientific Research and the Körber European Science Prize, in 2020 the Japan Prize, in 2021 the Massry Prize and in 2022 the Nobel Prize in Physiology or Medicine for sequencing the first Neanderthal genome.

== Personal life ==
Pääbo wrote in his 2014 book Neanderthal Man: In Search of Lost Genomes that he is bisexual. He assumed he was gay until he met Linda Vigilant, an American primatologist and geneticist whose "boyish charms" attracted him. "I had many relationships with men, but I also had girlfriends now and again". They have co-authored many papers, are married and raising a son and a daughter together in Leipzig.

== Distinctions ==
- (Sweden) : Commander Grand Cross of the Royal Order of the Polar Star (21 March 2024) (KmstkNO)

== See also ==
- Origins of Us (2011 BBC series)
- First Peoples (2015 PBS series)
- List of Nobel laureates in Physiology or Medicine
- List of Swedish Nobel laureates
