= Sune Bergström =

Swedish biochemist (1916–2004)

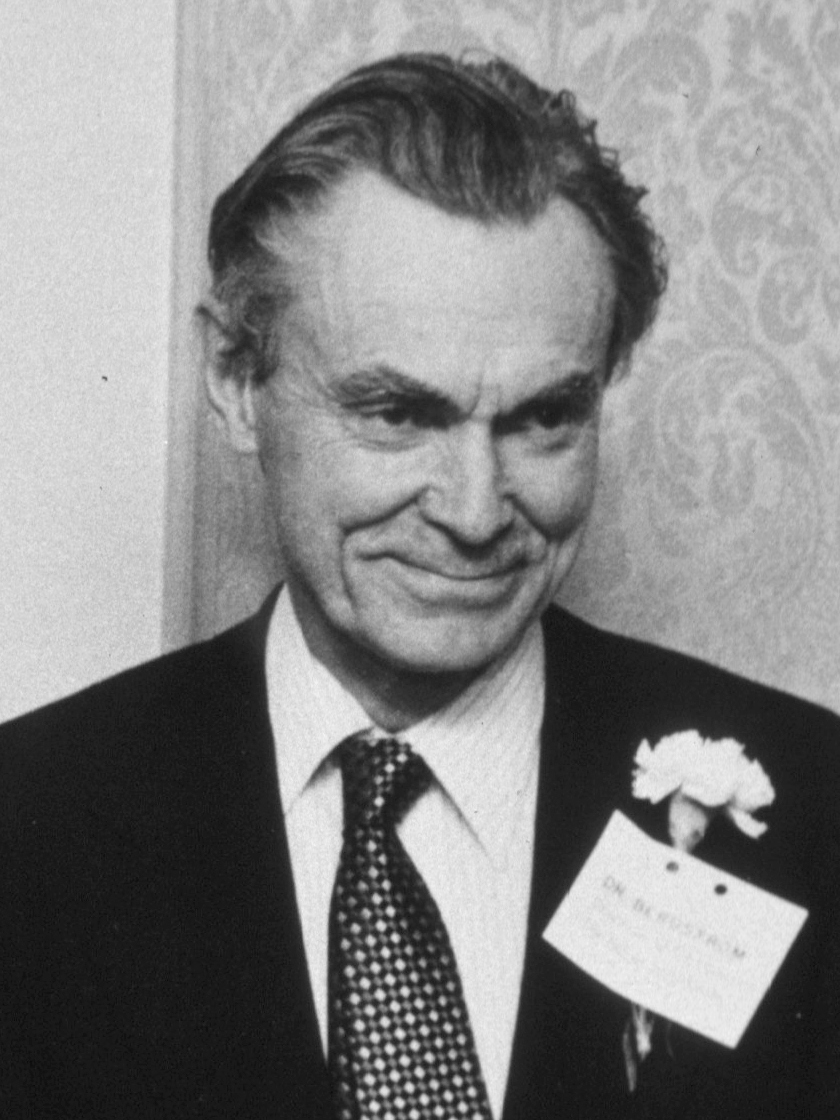
- Bergström in 1980
- Born: Karl Sune Detlof Bergström; 10 January 1916; Stockholm, Sweden
- Died: 15 August 2004 (aged 88)
- Known for: Prostaglandin discoveries
- Relatives: Svante Pääbo (son)
- Awards: Gairdner Foundation International Award (1972); Cameron Prize for Therapeutics of the University of Edinburgh (1977); Louisa Gross Horwitz Prize (1975); Welch Award in Chemistry (1980); Nobel Prize Medicine (1982); Illis quorum (1985)
- Scientific career
- Fields: Biochemistry
- Workplaces: Columbia University

Karl Sune Detlof Bergström (10 January 1916 – 15 August 2004) was a Swedish biochemist. In 1975, he was appointed to the Nobel Foundation Board of Directors in Sweden, and was awarded the Louisa Gross Horwitz Prize from Columbia University, together with Bengt I. Samuelsson. He shared the Nobel Prize in Physiology or Medicine with Bengt I. Samuelsson and John R. Vane in 1982, for discoveries concerning prostaglandins and related substances.

Bergström was elected a member of the Royal Swedish Academy of Sciences in 1965, and its president in 1983. In 1965, he was also elected a member of the Royal Swedish Academy of Engineering Sciences. He was elected a Foreign Honorary Member of the American Academy of Arts and Sciences in 1966. He was also a member of both the United States National Academy of Sciences and the American Philosophical Society. Bergström was awarded the Cameron Prize for Therapeutics of the University of Edinburgh in 1977. In 1985, he was appointed member of the Pontifical Academy of Sciences. He was awarded the Illis quorum in 1985.

In 1943, Bergström married Maj Gernandt. He had two sons, the businessman Rurik Reenstierna, with Maj Gernandt; and the evolutionary geneticist Svante Pääbo (winner of the 2022 Nobel Prize in Physiology or Medicine), from an extramarital affair with Karin Pääbo, an Estonian chemist. Both sons were born in 1955, and Rurik learned about the existence of his half-brother Svante only around 2004.

== Orders, decorations and medals ==
- Order of the Polar Star
- Illis quorum

Non-profit organization positions
Preceded by Ulf von Euler	Chairman of the Nobel Foundation; 1975–1987	Succeeded by Lars Gyllensten
