= Max Planck Institute for Evolutionary Anthropology =

Research institute based in Leipzig, Germany

Coordinates: 51°19′14″N 12°23′40″E

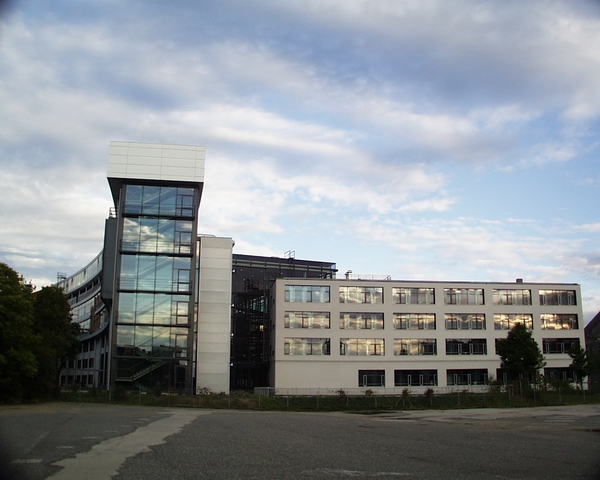
The main building of MPI EVA in Leipzig, Germany

The Max Planck Institute for Evolutionary Anthropology (German: Max-Planck-Institut für evolutionäre Anthropologie, shortened to MPI EVA) is a research institute in the Max Planck Society network, based in Leipzig, Germany. It was founded in 1997 by French-Swiss primatologist Christophe Boesch and Swedish geneticist (and later Nobel laureate) Svante Pääbo, and was a central location in the development of archaeogenetics and molecular anthropology as scientific disciplines. The institute currently represents researchers from over 30 nations, and is closely affiliated with Leipzig University. Many MPI EVA researchers hold joint appointments at the University, which also co-administrates the institute's International Max Planck Research School, the Leipzig School of Human Origins.

Well-known research leaders currently and formerly working at the institute include Svante Pääbo and Johannes Krause (archaeogenetics), Christophe Boesch (primatology), Janet Kelso (genetics), Jean-Jacques Hublin (human evolution), Richard McElreath (evolutionary ecology), Mark Stoneking (evolutionary anthropology), Hugo Zeberg (evolutionary medicine), and Russell Gray (linguistic and cultural evolution).

== Departments ==
The institute employs approximately 375 people organized into seven Departments, multiple Research Groups, and The Leipzig School of Human Origins. The former department of Linguistics, which existed from 1998 to 2015, was closed in May 2015, upon the retirement of its director, Bernard Comrie. The former department of Developmental and Comparative Psychology operated from 1998 to 2018 under director Michael Tomasello.

As of July 2026, the departments and respective research groups are:

- Department of Archeogenetics (Johannes Krause)
  - Computational Pathogenomics
  - Evolutionary Genomics
  - Genetic History
  - Haplo Group
  - Max Planck–Harvard Research Center for the Archaeoscience of the Ancient Mediterranean
  - Microbiome Sciences (Christina Warinner)
  - Molecular Anthropology
  - Molecular Palaeopathology (Kirsten Bos)
  - Population Genetics
  - Otto Hahn Research Group for Tropical Archaeogenomics
- Department of Comparative Cultural Psychology (Daniel Haun)
  - Facets of Early Social Learning
  - Human-Animal Relations
  - Pan Cultures (referring to the genus containing chimpaznees and bonobos)
  - Crow Cognition
  - Adaptive Learning
- Department of Evolutionary Genetics (Svante Pääbo)
  - Neandertals and More (Svante Pääbo)
  - Advanced DNA Sequencing Techniques (Matthias Meyer)
  - Computational Ancient Genomics (Janet Kelso)
  - Ancient Genomes and Contemporary Health (Hugo Zeberg)
  - Genetic Diversity through Space and Time
  - Genome Engineering and Repair
  - Max Planck Research Group Ancient Environmental Genomics
  - Lise Meitner Research Group for Hominin Palaeogenomics
- Department of Human Behavior, Ecology and Culture (Richard McElreath)
  - Comparative Behavioral Ecology
  - Culture, Environment, and Health
  - Culture, Environment, and Child Development
  - Data Provenance
  - Models of Sociality, Art, Information and Culture (MOSAIC)
  - Sanguatsiniq Research Project
  - Theory in Cultural Evolution Lab
  - ERC – Ape Attachment Project (Former)
  - ERC – Waves of history in the South Pacific (Former)
- Department of Human Origins (Tracy Kivell)
  - Cranial Evolution and Development
  - Stone Tool Origins
  - Ape and Human Biomechanics
  - Postcranial Functional Morphology
  - Dental Evolution and Development
- Department of Primate Behavior and Evolution (Jenny Tung)
  - Genes and Behavior
  - Gorilla Group
  - Molecular Ecology
  - Skeletal Genomics
  - Social Microbiome
  - Statistical Demography
- Department of Linguistic and Cultural Evolution (Russell Gray)

== Neanderthal genome ==
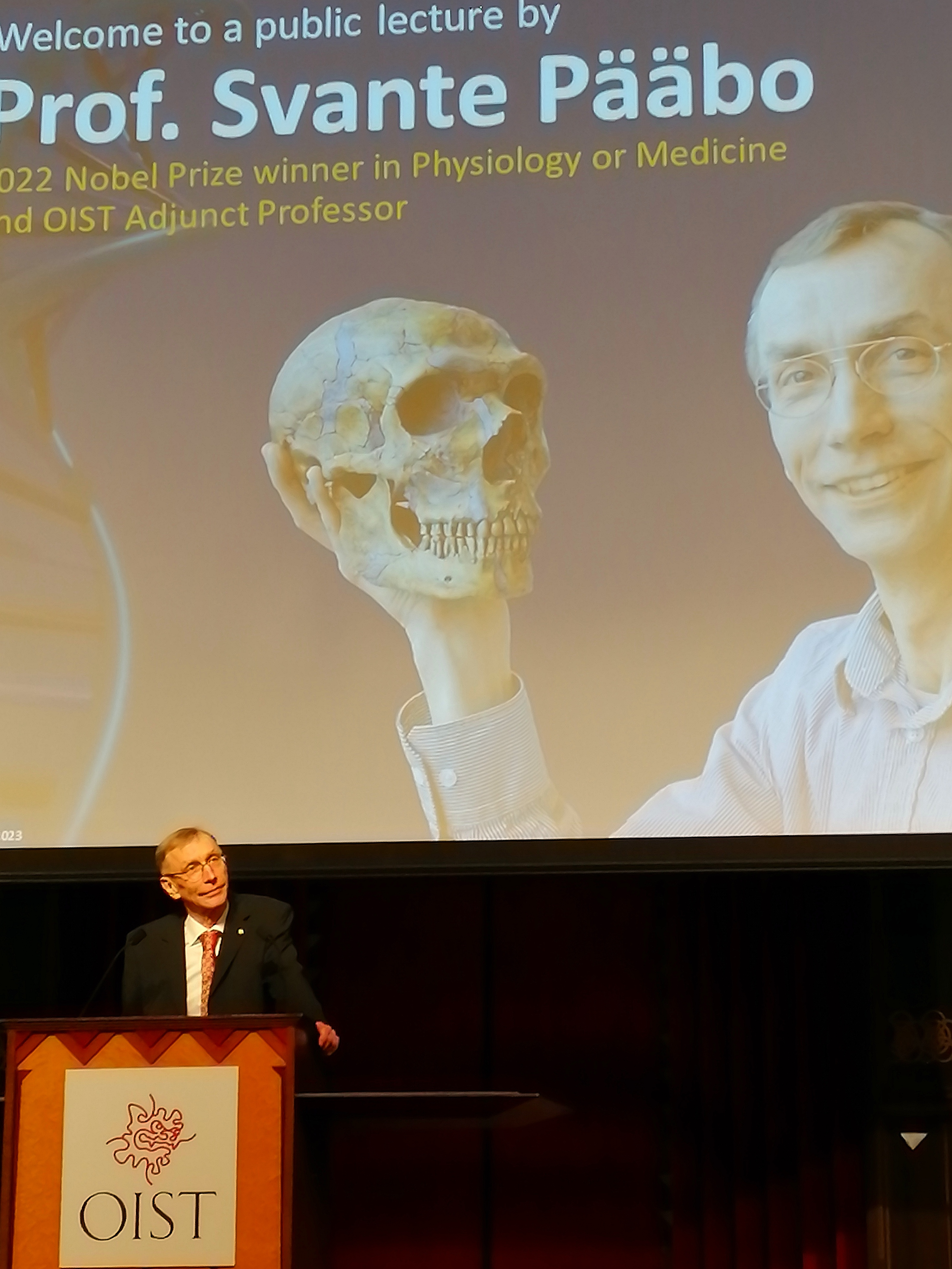
Pääbo at the University of Tokyo in 2023.

In July 2006, the MPI EVA and 454 Life Sciences announced that they would be sequencing the Neanderthal genome. Results of the study were published in the May 2010 journal Science detailing an initial draft of the reference Neanderthal genome based on the analysis of four billion base pairs of Neanderthal DNA. It was thought that a comparison of the Neanderthal genome and human genome would expand our understanding of Neanderthals, as well as the evolution of humans and human brains. The study determined that some mixture of genes occurred between Neanderthals and anatomically modern humans and presented evidence that elements of their genome remain in that of non-African modern humans.

MPI EVA director Svante Pääbo and colleagues tested more than 70 Neanderthal specimens and found only one that had sufficiently intact and abundanct DNA to sequence. Preliminary sequencing from a 38,000-year-old bone fragment from a femur found in 1980 at Vindija Cave in Croatia illustrated that Neanderthals and Homo sapiens share about 99.5% of their DNA. It is believed that the two species shared a common ancestor at least 500,000 years ago. The authors of the Nature article have calculated that the two species diverged about 516,000 years ago, whereas fossil records show a time of about 400,000 years ago.

In 2022, Pääbo was awarded the Nobel Prize in Physiology or Medicine for "discoveries concerning the genomes of extinct hominins and human evolution".

== Denisovan genome ==
Several months after the publication of the first Neanderthal genome, MPI EVA researchers published another paper on a genome sequenced from a hominin finger bone excavated from Denisova Cave in Siberia, which was closely related but markedly distinct from the recently published Neanderthal genome. A new population was described, Denisovans, which contributed 4–6% of its genome to modern Melanesians, similar to the Neanderthal genetic contributions to people of European and other non-African ancestry. The

== Early Homo sapiens ==
Dating carried out at the MPI EVA revealed that the Jebel Irhoud site and its Homo sapiens fossils were far older than first thought. Fresh excavations revealed the remains of at least five people and a number of stone tools. The finds included part of a skull, a jawbone, teeth, and limb bones that had come from three adults, a juvenile, and a child aged about seven and a half years old. The bones looked similar facially to those of humans today, but had much larger lower jaws and elongated braincases. They have similar features to a skull dating to 260,000 years ago that was found at the other end of the continent, in Florisbad, South Africa, which has been attributed to Homo sapiens on the basis of the Jebel Irhoud finds.

Jean-Jacques Hublin at Jebel Irhoud (Morocco), pointing to the crushed human skull (Irhoud 10) whose orbits are visible just beyond his finger tip.

The tools were found alongside gazelle bones and lumps of charcoal, indicating the presence of fire and probably of cooking in the cave. The gazelle bones showed characteristic signs of butchery and cooking, such as cut marks, notches consistent with marrow extraction, and charring. Some of the tools had been burned due to fires being lit on top of them, presumably after they had been discarded. This enabled the researchers to use thermoluminescence dating to ascertain when the burning had happened, and by proxy, the age of the fossil bones, which were found in the same deposit layer. The burnt tools were dated to approximately 315,000 years ago, indicating that the fossils are of about the same age. This conclusion was confirmed by recalculating the age of the Irhoud 3 mandible, which produced an age range compatible with that of the tools, at roughly 280,000 to 350,000 years old. As of 2017, this would make the remains the earliest known examples of Homo sapiens.

This suggests that, rather than modern humans arising in East Africa approximately 200,000 years ago, it appears that humans may already have been present across the length of Africa 100,000 years earlier. According to Jean-Jacques Hublin, "The idea is that early Homo sapiens dispersed around the continent and elements of human modernity appeared in different places, and so different parts of Africa contributed to the emergence of what we call modern humans today." Early humans may have comprised a large, interbreeding population dispersed across Africa whose spread was facilitated by a wetter climate that created a "green Sahara", approximately 300,000 to 330,000 years ago. The rise of modern humans may thus have taken place on a continental scale, rather than being confined to a particular corner of Africa.

== Linguistics ==
In 2005, the World Atlas of Language Structures, a project of the institute's former department of Linguistics, was published. The atlas consists of more than 140 maps, each displaying a particular language feature – for example order of adjective and noun – for between 120 and 1370 languages of the world. In 2008 the atlas was also published online and the underlying database made freely available.

The MPI EVA also maintained the Glottolog until 2015, when it was taken over by the Max Planck Institute for the Science of Human History in Jena.

Researchers at the institute have developed a computer model analyzing early toddler conversations to predict the structure of later conversations, a central topic in the theory of language acquisition in humans. They showed that toddlers develop their own individual rules for speaking with slots into which they could put certain kinds of words, a topic now referred to as "chunking". The rules inferred from toddler speech were better predictors of subsequent speech than traditional grammars.

== Wolfgang Köhler Primate Research Centre ==
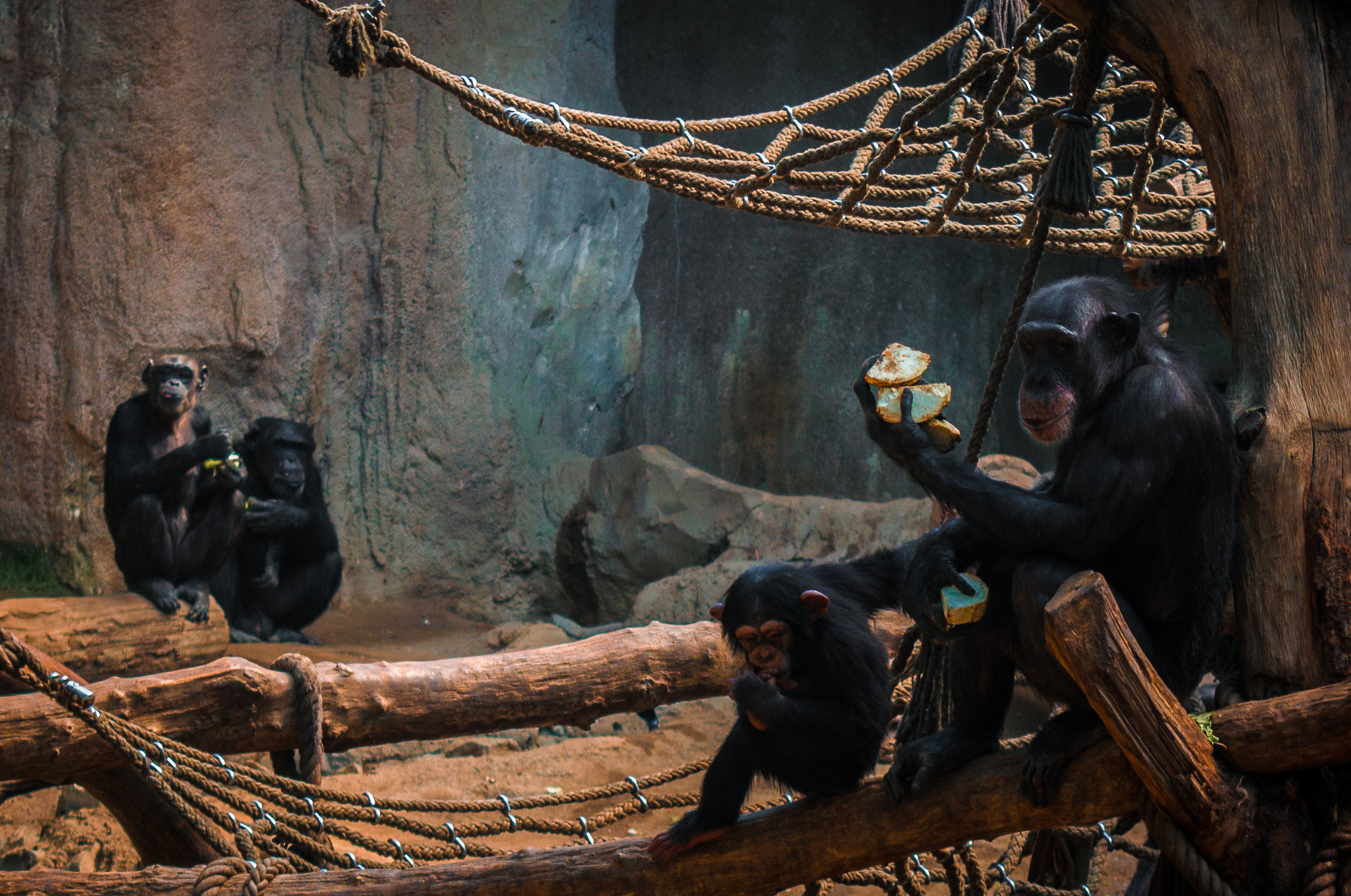
Several bonobos (Pan paniscus) socializing in one of the indoor section of their enclosure at Pongoland.

The Wolfgang Köhler Primate Research Centre, also publicly known as Pongoland, is a project of the MPI EVA and located at the nearby Leipzig Zoo. It was founded in April 2001 by MPI EVA researchers including then-co-director Michael Tomasello and primatologist Josep Call. It was named after the German psychologist Wolfgang Köhler, who pioneered the study of non-human primate cognition on captive chimpanzees in the Canary Islands, and is the only primate research institute in the world housing all four great ape taxa: chimpanzees, bonobos, gorillas, and orangutans.

Researchers at the Centre have published hundreds of papers since its founding in 2001, including some of the first experimental evidence on theory of mind in non-human apes, as well as new research methodologies such as primate eye-tracking and the EVApeCognition Dataset, an open database encompassing 18 years of primate behavioral data from over 150 published papers. Notably, the discovery that chimpanzees expect other individuals to act based upon beliefs the observing chimp knows to be false, was first made at the Centre by primatologist Christopher Krupenye and colleagues. This has since become a popular diagnostic criterion for theory of mind in ethology, the study of behavior in non-human animals.

== See also ==
- Max Planck Institute for the Science of Human History
- Max Planck Society
- Leipzig University
- Paleoanthropology
- Neanderthal genome project
