= Max Planck Harvard Research Center for the Archaeoscience of the Ancient Mediterranean =

Research center at Harvard University

The creation of the Max Planck Harvard Research Center for the Archaeoscience of the Ancient Mediterranean (MHAAM) was announced in February 2017 at Harvard University. It was inaugurated with a workshop and a signing ceremony at Harvard University on October 10, 2017, when the president of the Max Planck Society, Martin Stratmann, and Harvard's vice-provost for international affairs signed a five-year agreement.

The center is a collaboration between the Max Planck Institute for the Science of Human History (MPISHH) and the Initiative for the Science of the Human Past at Harvard (SoHP). The center's co-directors are Johannes Krause (MPISHH) and Michael McCormick (History Department, Harvard University and chair SoHP); David Reich (Department of Genetics, Harvard University), and Philipp Stockhammer (MPISHH and LMU Munich) serve as deputy directors.

Its initial research projects focus on genetic and other biomolecular archaeological evidence for migrations in the ancient Mediterranean, and the genetics and historical impact of ancient pathogens.
