= TKTL1 =

Mammalian protein found in Homo sapiens

Identifiers
- Aliases: TKTL1, TKR, TKT2, transketolase-like 1, transketolase like 1
- External IDs: OMIM: 300044; MGI: 1933244; GeneCards: TKTL1
Enzyme activity
EC #	BRENDA	ExPASy	KEGG	MetaCyc
2.2.1.1	↗	↗	↗	↗

Gene location (Human)
Chr.	X chromosome (human)
Band	Xq28	Start	154,295,795 bp
Band	Xq28	End	154,330,350 bp

Gene location (Mouse)
Chr.	X chromosome (mouse)
Band	X|X A7.3	Start	73,220,865 bp
Band	X|X A7.3	End	73,252,106 bp
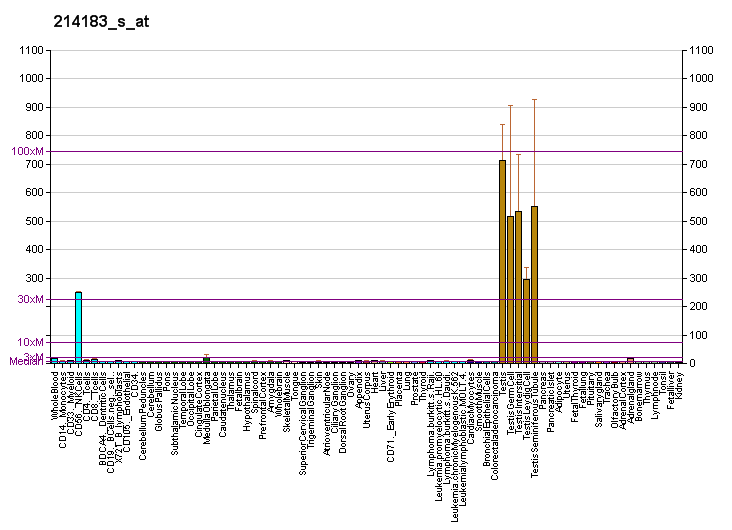

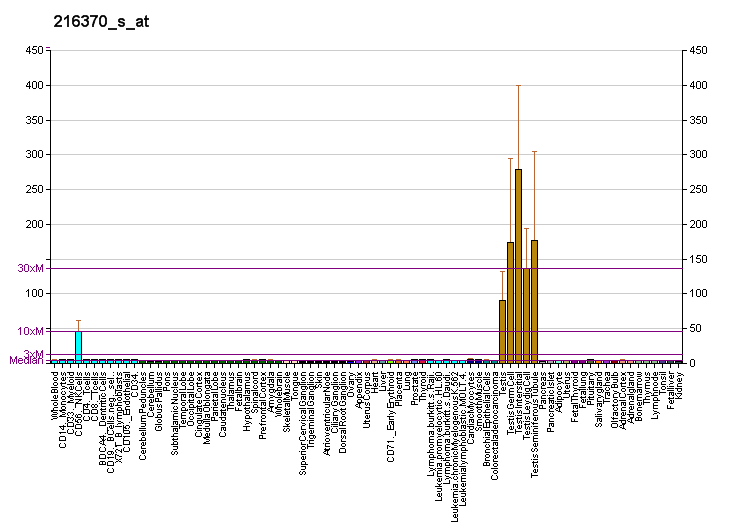
RNA expression pattern
Bgee	Human / Mouse (ortholog); Top expressed in: testicle; right testis; left testis; ventricular zone; gonad; male germ cell; sperm; right ventricle; myocardium of left ventricle; ganglionic eminence / Top expressed in: Gonadal ridge; morula; spermatid; embryo; seminiferous tubule; zygote; blastocyst; epithelium of stomach; ovary; lumbar subsegment of spinal cord; More reference expression data
BioGPS	More reference expression data
Gene ontology
Molecular function	transferase activity; catalytic activity; metal ion binding; transketolase activity
Cellular component	cytoplasm; nucleus
Biological process	thiamine metabolic process; metabolism; glucose catabolic process
Sources:Amigo / QuickGO
Orthologs
Databases	NCBI: entry; OMA: entry
Species	Human	Mouse
Entrez	8277	83553
Ensembl	ENSG00000007350	ENSMUSG00000031397
UniProt	P51854	Q99MX0
RefSeq (mRNA)	NM_012253; NM_001145933; NM_001145934	NM_031379
RefSeq (protein)	NP_001139405; NP_001139406; NP_036385	NP_113556
Location (UCSC)	Chr X: 154.3 – 154.33 Mb	Chr X: 73.22 – 73.25 Mb
PubMed search
- Wikidata
View/Edit Human	View/Edit Mouse

Transketolase-like-1 (TKTL1) is a gene closely related to the transketolase gene (TKT). It emerged in mammals during the course of evolution and, according to the latest research findings, is considered one of the key genes that distinguishes modern humans (Homo sapiens) from Neanderthals. However, some modern humans also exhibit the "archaic" transketolase-like-1 allele attributed to Neanderthals, with no known effects.

The proteins formed by the two transketolase genes form a heterodimer (TKTL1-TKT). Once expressed, the TKTL1 protein displaces a TKT protein from the TKT-TKT homodimer, leading to the formation of a TKTL1-TKT heterodimer. This heterodimer is enzymatically very different from the transketolase homodimer (TKT-TKT), as the heterodimer leads to a significant increase in ribose-5-phosphate in cells. TKTL1 also allows formation of acetyl-CoA, an important component for the synthesis of lipids and steroids.

The TKTL1-Gene was discovered by Dr. Johannes Coy and first published 1996.

== Function ==
The basic components ribose-5-phosphate and acetyl-CoA, which are formed by TKTL1, provide essential building blocks for the formation of new cells. TKTL1 controls the cell cycle and enables its execution by providing ribose, the building block necessary for DNA synthesis. The production of ribose also provides the building block for DNA damage repair, so that activation of TKTL1 enables cancer cells to repair DNA damage induced by chemotherapy or radiotherapy more effectively and thus become resistant to these therapies.

=== Hypoxia ===
TKTL1 also allows survival in the absence of oxygen (hypoxia). This protective program is triggered, for example, in the event of a ruptured blood vessel and a resulting oxygen deficiency. TKTL1 controls this hypoxia program, which allows cell survival in the absence of oxygen by fermenting glucose into lactic acid. The acid formed allows acid-based matrix degradation and tissue remodeling as well as inhibition of immune cells that eliminate tumor cells. At the same time, TKTL1 and lactic acid control new blood vessel formation, which restores the supply of oxygen to healthy tissue or a tumor.

=== Cell cycle ===
The cell cycle is controlled differently than assumed. The previous approach assumed that the consumption of ribose-5-phosphate, which begins with the initiation of the cell cycle, triggers a corresponding post-production so that the desired cell duplication can be accomplished (pull theory: "consumption pulls production").

TKTL1 is expressed first, followed by the formation of the heterodimer from TKTL1-TKT, which significantly increases the ribose-5-phosphate concentration, triggering the cell cycle. The TKTL1-mediated, increased ribose-5-phosphate concentration thus pushes the cell into the cell cycle (push effect).

On one hand, this metabolism forms the basis for new formation of healthy cells, however, on the other hand, it also leads to the new formation of undesired cells, such as cancer cells. TKTL1 plays a crucial role in the malignancy of cancer cells, regardless of the type of cancer. Both the proliferation rate and the ability to spread throughout the body and form metastases depend on TKTL1. and the ability to spread throughout the body and form metastases depend on TKTL1. Furthermore, TKTL1 also mediates protection of cancer cells from attack by the body's immune system, for example, by blocking killer cells via lactic acid formed (acid arrest), thus preventing them from reaching and killing cancer cells. In addition, TKTL1 also systematically suppresses the immune system, preventing tumors from being eliminated by the immune system.

=== Neuronal development ===
TKTL1 has been shown to be involved in regulating neuronal development in the cerebral cortex. A single nucleotide difference in the gene from archaic humans, including Neanderthals and Denisovans, and apes, is involved in neurodevelopment and may have resulted in humans possessing greater cognitive abilities. The "archaic" allele is present in 0.03% of all Homo sapiens, and yet no associated deficiencies are known in these carriers.

A Dresden research team led by Nobel Prize winner in medicine Svante Pääbo and Wieland B. Huttner were able to show in 2022 that modern humans produce more neurons in the frontal lobe during brain development than Neanderthals, caused by a change in a single amino acid found in the protein TKTL1. In Neanderthals, lysine is found there rather than arginine as in humans. Pääbo et al. thus answer the question of what makes modern humans unique compared to our closest relatives, the Neanderthals. However, Pääbo et al. in fact caution against this interpretation, conceding in a reply to a comment that the implications for the adult brain, let alone behavior, are unknown. They concur with Herai et al. that "any attempt to discuss prefrontal cortex and cognitive advantage of modern humans over Neandertals based on TKTL1 alone is problematic". Additionally, Herai et al. contend that "more is not always better": increased neuron production can lead to "an abnormally enlarged cortex and layer-specific imbalances in glia/neuron ratios and neuronal subpopulations during neurodevelopment".

When researching differences in gene expressions in the brains of domesticated and wild animals in 2012, Svante Pääbo also came across the TKTL1 gene. The researchers discovered that TKTL1 is the gene with the most significant difference in expression between domesticated dogs and wild wolves: activation of the gene is 47-fold higher in dogs than in wolves.

== Evolution ==
TKTL1 is a gene that arose from the transketolase gene of lower vertebrates by gene duplication in the course of vertebrate evolution and underwent crucial changes during their evolution. It is found only in mammals. In addition to the transketolase genes TKT and TKTL1, there is another member of the transketolase gene family in mammals, the TKTL2 gene. The TKTL2 gene arose by integration of a TKTL1 mRNA into the genome and thus, in contrast to the TKT and TKTL1 genes, has no introns. Contrary to the TKT and TKTL1 genes, it is not yet clear in the case of the TKTL2 gene whether and what function TKTL2 performs. Compared to TKT and TKTL2, the TKTL1 protein has a deletion of 38 amino acids triggered by the non-use of the third exon. This deletion of 38 amino acids also includes highly conserved and invariant amino acids that are present in all known transketolases. Due to the absence of these amino acids, which normally are always present in transketolases, the functionality of the TKTL1 protein was doubted for a long time. It was not until 2019 that a major breakthrough in deciphering the function of the TKTL1 gene was achieved by showing that the TKTL1 gene is able to displace a TKT protein from the TKT-TKT transketolase homodimer and form a TKTL1-TKT heterodimer that shows altered enzyme properties compared to the TKT-TKT homodimer. Up to now, it is or was assumed that transketolases are enzymes that are active as homodimers. The detection of TKTL1-TKT heterodimers and the accompanying altered enzyme properties are of greatest importance to mammals because the altered enzyme properties trigger the formation of new cells by increasing the production of ribose, and thus significantly increasing the concentration of ribose in the cell. Since the sugar ribose and the deoxy-ribose formed from it are the crucial building block for DNA and RNA, the formation of the TKTL1-TKT heterodimer leads to the formation of the necessary sugar building block to create new DNA and RNA for the duplication of cells. TKTL1 controls the duplication of cells (cell cycle) and ensures that sufficient building blocks are present for cell duplication. It was furthermore shown in 2021 that activation of transketolase is also used by viruses such as the SARS-CoV virus to influence the metabolism of the virus-infected cell in a manner that increases the production of the sugar building block ribose for new viruses, and thus viruses are produced more quickly and at a higher rate. In addition to the formation of the sugar building block ribose, TKTL1 is able to form acetyl-CoA, another crucial building block for new cells. Acetyl-CoA is the basic building block for the formation of energy-rich compounds such as fatty acids, ketone bodies or cholesterol. The TKTL1 enabled formation of acetyl-CoA represents a previously unknown pathway for the formation of acetyl-CoA. This pathway makes it possible to form acetyl-CoA even when acetyl-CoA formation, which runs via pyruvate dehydrogenase, is switched off. In contrast to pyruvate dehydrogenase-mediated acetyl-CoA formation, no decarboxylation is carried out with the help of TKTL1, so that the conversion of sugar to fat is possible without the loss of carbon atoms. This allows a cell to form acetyl-CoA much more effectively in order to form new cellular material such as cell membranes.

== Detection methods ==
Currently, three lab methods exist for the detection of TKTL1. These are the direct determination of TKTL1 from blood, the immunohistochemical examination of tumor tissue for risk assessment, which is currently offered exclusively in the Bad Berka pathology department in Germany, and the measurement of TKTL1 in macrophages using EDIM technology, which is applied in the combined TKTL1 and DNaseX (Apo10) detection of PanTum Detect blood test.

== Clinical significance ==
=== Cancer ===
TKTL1 protein was first detected in healthy cells and in tumor cells by immunohistochemistry in 2005. Shortly thereafter, TKTL1 protein was shown to be increased in tumors compared to healthy tissue, and it identified patients with colorectal cancer and bladder cancer who showed faster mortality. This study also discussed the role of TKTL1 in the fermentation of glucose to lactic acid despite the presence of oxygen, which was first described by Nobel Prize winner Otto Heinrich Warburg and which he termed "aerobic glycolysis". The coined term aerobic glycolysis used by Warburg, which he created to describe fermentation that was anaerobic but carried out under aerobic conditions, i.e., despite the presence of oxygen, led to great misunderstanding. In Warburg's honor, the fermentation of glucose to lactic acid was called the Warburg effect. In a 2006 study by Langbein et al., the Warburg effect was reinterpreted and the importance of this metabolic fermentation process for invasive destructive growth and metastasis of cancer cells was discussed. A subsequent study by Langbein demonstrated the role of TKTL1 and the switch of energy release to fermentation mediated by it in the metastasis of renal carcinomas, identifying the clinical significance of TKTL1 expression in early tumor stages. The study was able to show that apparently quite benign tumors (stage T1) which led to the death of renal cancer patients after a short time were detected by TKTL1.

The clinical significance of TKTL1 as a marker in tumors for faster death (poor prognosis) of cancer patients has been demonstrated in a large number of studies. Studies in chronological order: 2006 – bladder and colon cancer, 2007 – ovarian cancer, 2009 – pediatric anaplastic nephroblastoma, 2011 – rectal cancer, 2011 – lung cancer, 2012 – eye cancer, 2013 – oral cavity carcinoma, 2015 – esophageal cancer, 2015 – gastric cancer, 2018 – lung cancer, 2019 – HPV infected cervix, 2019 – ovarian cancer, 2020 – colorectal cancer, 2021 – liver cancer, 2021 – colorectal cancer.

=== Cancer diagnostics ===
Since all forms of cancer benefit from TKTL1-mediated malignancy factors, such as increased proliferation, oxygen-independent growth, invasiveness/metastasis and suppression of the immune system, detection of the TKTL1 protein affords the opportunity to detect cancer or premalignant lesions (precancerous lesions) using a blood sample.

Detection of TKTL1 and another protein (DNaseX/Apo10) in blood scavenger cells can be used to detect colorectal cancer, bile duct cancer and pancreatic cancer very well and more effectively than with conventional test methods (tumor markers).

Detection of TKTL1 and another protein (DNaseX/Apo10) in blood scavenger cells provide a sensitive and specific evidence of the presence of rhabdomyosarcoma and neuroblastoma.

=== Other diseases ===
The importance is currently being researched, including its association with:

- Radical formation, DNA damage and premature aging
- Male fertility
