= List of University of Leeds people =

This list of University of Leeds people is a selected list of notable past staff and students of the University of Leeds.

== Students ==
=== Politics ===
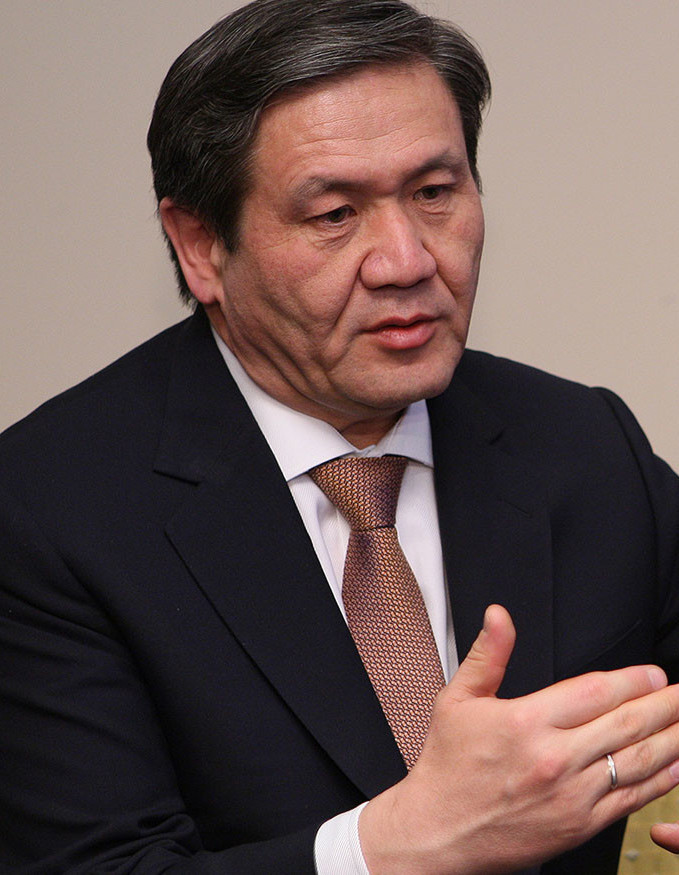
Nambaryn Enkhbayar, President of Mongolia

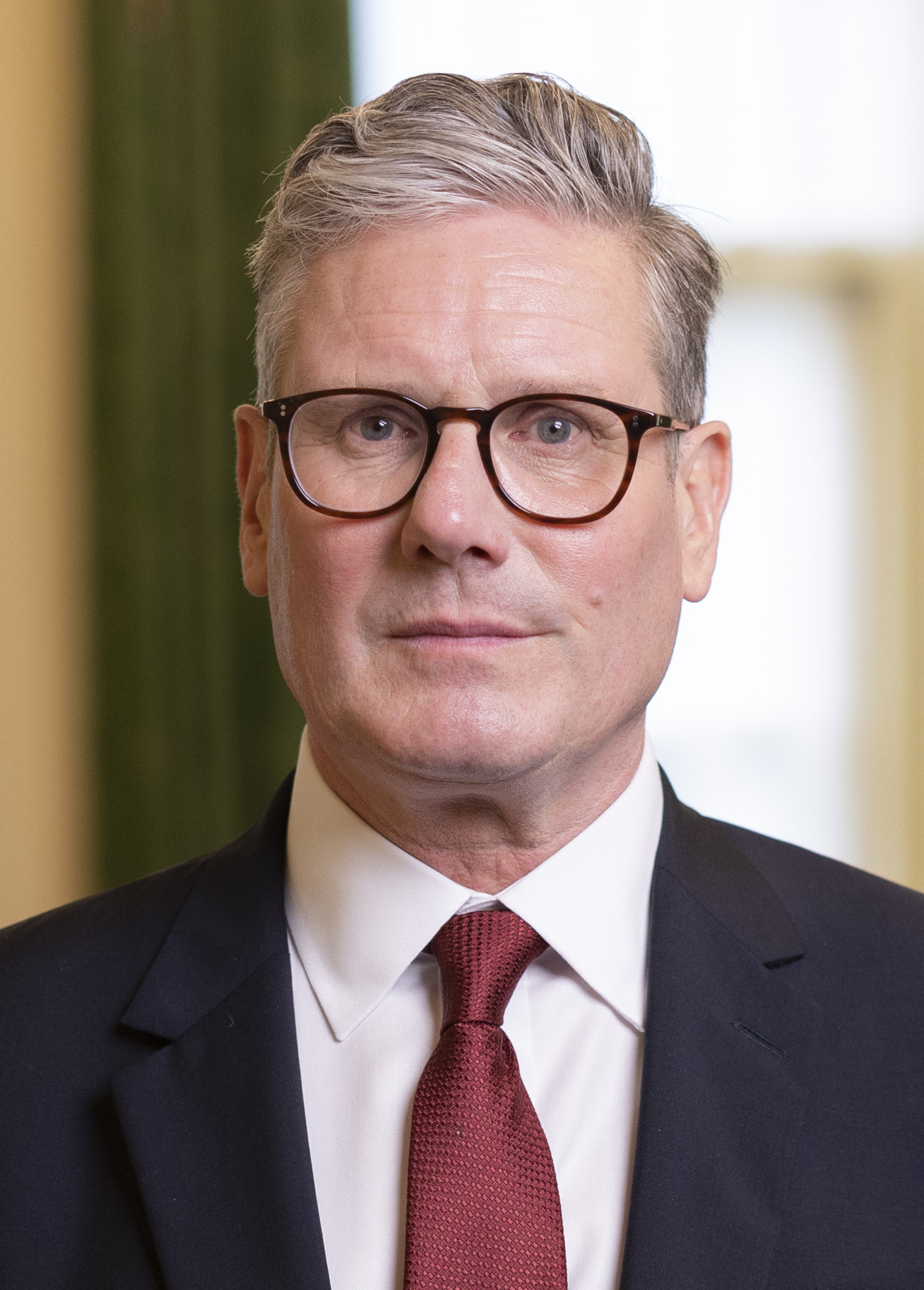
Keir Starmer, Prime Minister of the United Kingdom

- Catherine Connolly, President of Ireland since 2025 (MSc in clinical psychology, 1981)
- Hage Geingob, former President of Namibia
- Kwabena Kwakye Anti, Ghanaian politician
- John Battle, former Labour Member of Parliament for Leeds West (English, 1976)
- Irwin Bellow, Baron Bellwin, former Conservative Minister of State for the Environment (LLB in Law)
- Alan Campbell, Labour Member of Parliament for Tynemouth and former Government Whip (PGCE)
- Mark Collett, former chairman of the Young BNP, the youth division of the British National Party; Director of Publicity for the Party before being suspended from the party in early April 2010 (Business Economics, 2002)
- Nambaryn Enkhbayar, former President of Mongolia (2000–2004) (exchange student, 1986)
- José Ángel Gurría, economist, secretary general of the Organisation for Economic Co-operation and Development
- Ken Hind, barrister and former Conservative Member of Parliament for West Lancashire (Law, 1971)
- Eric Illsley, Labour Member of Parliament for Barnsley Central (LLB in Law)
- Chris Leslie, Former Labour Member of Parliament for Shipley (1997–2005) and Nottingham East (2010–19) (Politics and Parliamentary Studies, 1994)
- Andrew Leung, current President of the Legislative Council of Hong Kong.
- Alison Lowe, first black woman Leeds City Councillor (History, matriculated 1987)
- Simba Makoni, Zimbabwean Politician and candidate for Zimbabwe elections 2008
- Jess Phillips, Labour Member of Parliament for Birmingham Yardley (UK Parliament constituency) (Economics and Economic History and Social Policy, 2003)
- Rafizi Ramli, Minister of Economy of Malaysia (BEng Electrical Engineering, 1999)
- Khalid Samad, Malaysian politician and former Minister Of Federal Territories; Current Member of Parliament for Shah Alam
- Clare Short, former Labour Member of Parliament for Birmingham Ladywood and International Development Secretary (Political Science, 1969)
- Jeanne Siméon, current Minister of Habitat, Lands, Infrastructure, and Land Transport in the Seychelles (Education Management and Teacher Training)
- Bracewell Smith, businessman, Conservative Member of Parliament (1932–45) and Lord Mayor of London (1946)
- Alex Sobel, Labour Co-op Member of Parliament for Leeds North West (Information Systems, 1997)
- Keir Starmer, Prime Minister of the United Kingdom from 2024, Leader of the Labour Party from 2020, MP for Holborn and St Pancras from 2015, Director of Public Prosecutions, 2008–2013 (LLB Law, 1985)
- Jack Straw, barrister and Labour Member of Parliament for Blackburn; former Home Secretary and Foreign Secretary (LLB in Law, 1967)
- Paul Truswell, former Labour Member of Parliament for Pudsey (History, 1977)
- Sayeeda Warsi, Baroness Warsi, former Chairman of the Conservative Party and Minister without Portfolio (LLB in Law)
- Ahmad Samsuri Mokhtar, Chief Minister Terengganu and former lecturer (Aerospace)

=== Media ===
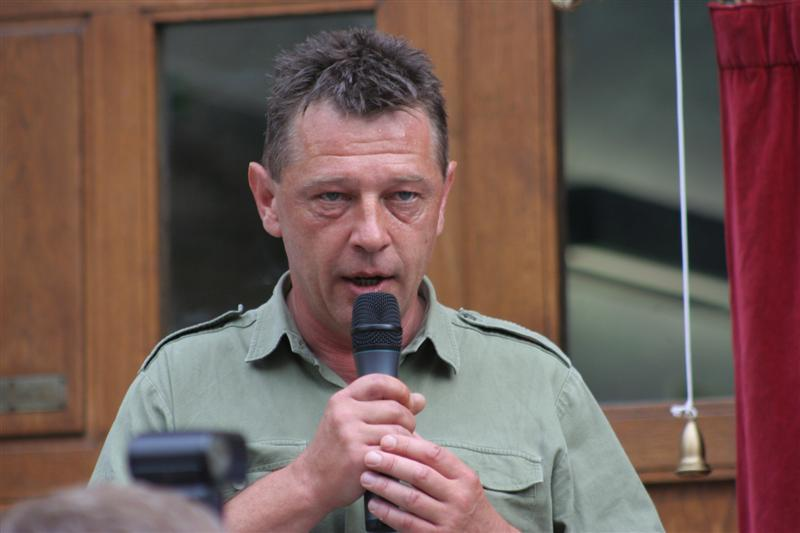
Andy Kershaw, journalist and radio D.J.

- Timothy Allen, photojournalist (Zoology, 1989)
- Steve Bell, political cartoonist for The Guardian (Fine Art, 1974)
- Mark Brayne, BBC foreign correspondent (BA, Modern Languages, 1973)
- Mark Byford, deputy Director-General of the BBC (LLB in Law, 1979)
- Martine Croxall, TV journalist and news presenter BBC News (BA Geography, 1990)
- Barry Cryer, comedian and scriptwriter (English, did not graduate, awarded an honorary doctorate in 2017)
- Paul Dacre, editor of the Daily Mail (English, 1970)
- Gavin Esler, Newsnight anchor (MA Anglo-Irish Literature, 1975)
- Polly Evans, television presenter, South East Today (English & Theatre, 1990s)
- Jenni Falconer, television presenter (Student, Spanish and Italian, 1990s)
- Tatiana Hambro, fashion writer and editor for Moda Operandi and British Vogue
- Nancy Kacungira, Ugandan presenter and correspondent, BBC News
- Andy Kershaw, DJ and broadcaster (Politics)
- Liz Kershaw, journalist and radio DJ (Textiles, 1978)
- Alice Levine, Co-host of My Dad Wrote a Porno and former BBC Radio 1 DJ
- Melanie McFadyean (1950–2023), journalist and lecturer
- Peter Morgan, screenwriter (Fine Art, 1985)
- Naga Munchetty, TV presenter and journalist (English Literature and Language, 1997)
- Nick Owen, English television presenter and newsreader (Classics, 1969)
- Richard Quest, reporter for CNN (Law, 1985)
- Anita Rani, English radio and television presenter and journalist (Broadcasting)
- Jay Rayner, features writer and restaurant critic, The Observer (Political Studies, 1987)
- Steve Rosenberg, BBC Russia editor (Russian Studies, 1991)
- Georgie Thompson, Sky Sports News presenter (Broadcast Journalism, 1999)
- Fergus Walsh, BBC medical editor (English Literature, 1983)
- Mark Wheat, radio DJ at The Current from Minnesota Public Radio (English, 1981)
- Nicholas Witchell, BBC newsreader and royal and diplomatic correspondent (LLB in Law, 1976)
- Alan Yentob, BBC Creative Director (LLB in Law, 1968)

=== Arts ===
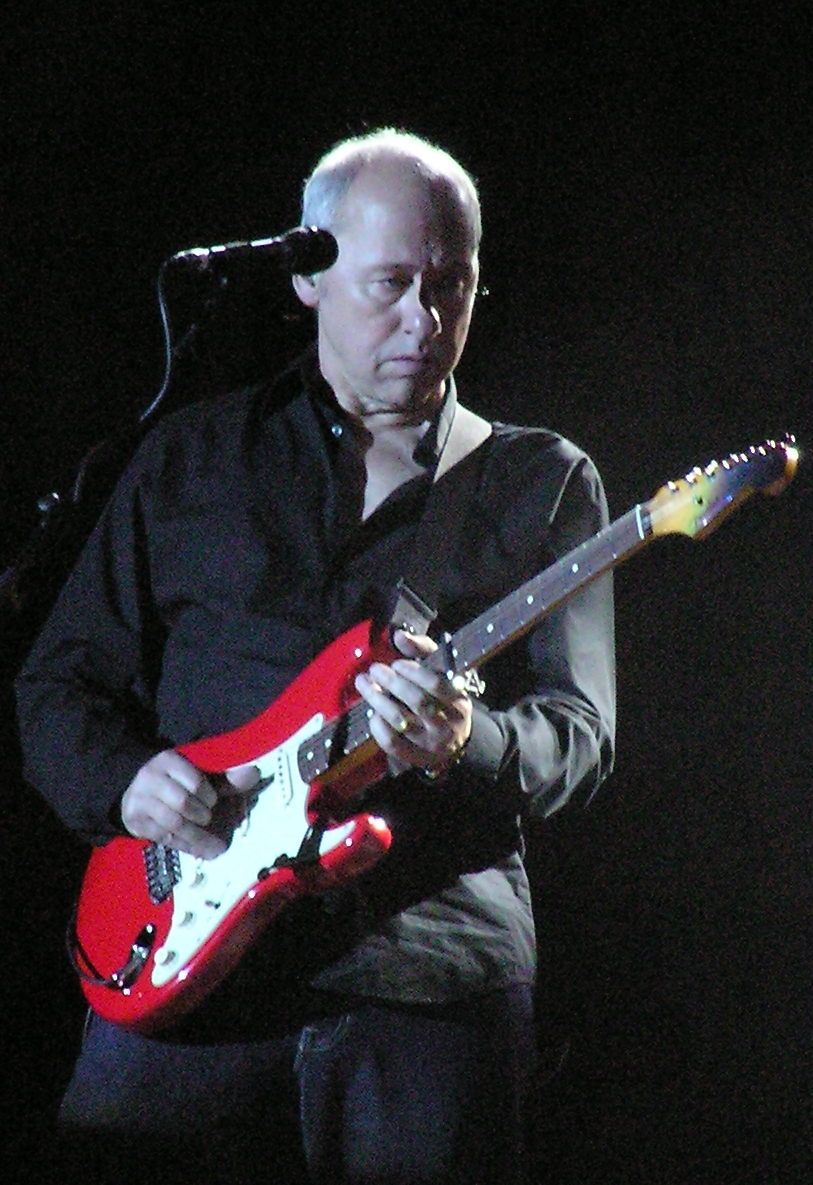
Mark Knopfler, musician

==== Music ====
- The members of Alt-J met at the university (Fine Art; English Literature, 2007)
- David Gedge, guitarist, songwriter and vocalist in The Wedding Present, Cinerama (band) (Mathematics, 1981)
- Alex Glasgow, singer/songwriter (German)
- Mark Knopfler, rock musician, guitarist, singer and songwriter (English, 1973)
- Little Boots, born Victoria Hesketh, electronica musician
- Corinne Bailey Rae, soul singer (English Literature, 2000)
- Simon Rix, bass player for Leeds band Kaiser Chiefs (Maths and Geography, 2000)
- Sigma (DJs), English drum and bass duo consisting of Cameron Edwards and Joe Lenzie
- Kyle Simmons, member of Bastille
- Dan Smith, member of Bastille
- Estelle White, composer
- Katie White, singer and guitarist of The Ting Tings
- Joanne Yeoh, Malaysian violinist (Music, 1999)

==== Theatre and Film ====
- Shona Auerbach, award-winning director/cinematographer of Dear Frankie
- Leslie Cheung, Hong Kong actor and singer (Textile Management, did not graduate due to family reasons, 1977)
- Emma Mackey, French-British actress
- Alistair McGowan, actor, comedian and impressionist (English, 1986)
- Kay Mellor, television actress and scriptwriter (attended Bretton Hall, 1983)
- Hannah New, English model and actress
- Kate Phillips, English actress
- Ronald Pickup, English actor (born 1962)
- Prem Matiyani (1950– 2016), theatre director, Sangeet Natak Akademi Award (2001)
- Chris Pine, American Hollywood actor, studied as a year abroad student during his junior year (English)
- Laura Rollins, English actress, studied English and Theatre
- Siddhanth, Indian Kannada actor, (studied M.H.A.)

==== Literary ====
- Patrick Allen, award-winning author and teacher (English and French, 1979)
- Nick Brownlee, crime thriller writer
- Jonathan Clements, writer (Japanese, 1994)
- Tony Harrison, poet (Classics with Linguistics, 1958)
- Storm Jameson, writer (English, 1912; MA 1914)
- Pamela Kola, Kenyan children's author
- Lucy Diamond, pen name of Sue Mongredien, children's author (English 1993)
- Arthur Ransome, writer, studied science for two terms in 1901
- Herbert Read, poet and literary critic (English)
- Wole Soyinka, Nigerian writer and first African winner of the Nobel Prize in Literature in 1986 (English, 1957)
- Greg Stekelman, writer and illustrator, author of A Year in the Life of TheManWhoFellAsleep (English and Spanish, 1998)
- Ngũgĩ wa Thiong'o, Kenyan author (English student, 1960s)

==== Other ====
- Paul Crowther, philosopher, university lecturer and author
- Jeremy Dyson, screenwriter and member of The League of Gentlemen (Philosophy, 1989)
- Jacky Fleming, award-winning cartoonist
- Barry John, theatre director and teacher
- Malcolm Neesam, historian of Harrogate, North Yorkshire
- Esther Simpson, organiser of academic equivalent of the kindertransport, saving refugee scholars from Nazis, campus building named after her in 2022.

=== Science and technology ===
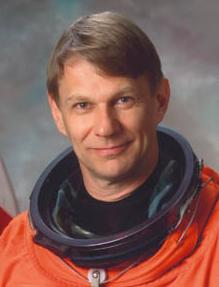
Piers Sellers, NASA astronaut

- Niaz Ahmad Akhtar, Vice-Chancellor of the University of the Punjab
- Lilias Armstrong, phonetician (B.A., 1906)
- Sir David Baulcombe, plant scientist (Botany, 1973)
- Robert Blackburn, aviation pioneer and founder of Blackburn Aircraft (Engineering, 1906)
- Dave Cliff, Professor of Computer Science, University of Bristol (Computational Science, 1987)
- Emily Cummins, Technology Woman of the Future 2006, British Female Innovator Of the Year 2007
- Val Curtis, professor in public health, London School of Hygiene and Tropical Medicine
- Bernadette Drummond, professor of dentistry at University of Otago and University of Leeds
- Mary Gibby, botanist and professor (Botany, 1971)
- Rubina Gillani, Pakistani medical doctor and public health specialist
- Edmund Happold, founder of Buro Happold and the Construction Industry Council (Civil Engineering, 1957)
- Sir Percival Hartley (1905) Director of Biological Standards, National Institute for Medical Research
- D. G. Hessayon, gardening author (Botany, 1950)
- Christina Jackson, engineer
- V. Craig Jordan, responsible for pioneering research into breast cancer and the development of the cancer drug tamoxifen (BSc and Ph.D. in pharmacology, 1969 and 1972)
- Esther Killick, physiologist (MB ChB 1929, MSc 1937, DSc 1952)
- Michael Lawrie, computer security and social networking expert (Computational Science, 1989)
- Michael Martin, bridge engineer (Civil Engineering, 1975)
- John E. M. Midgley (1935–2023), British biochemist
- Sir Timothy O'Shea, computer scientist and Vice-Chancellor and Principal of the University of Edinburgh
- George Porter, chemist, Nobel Prize winner and President of the Royal Society (Chemistry, 1941)
- Dan Quine, computer scientist
- Anya Reading, geophysics lecturer at the University of Tasmania (PhD Geophysics 1997)
- Malcolm Richardson, mycologist
- Dorothy Robson, physicist and engineer, worked for Ministry of Aircraft Production during World War II on the development of bombsights, died after a test flight crash at age 23.
- Piers Sellers, NASA astronaut (Biometeorology, 1981)
- Margot Shiner, gastroenterologist (Medicine, 1947)
- Karen Steel, geneticist, Principal Investigator at the Wellcome Trust Sanger Institute
- James Francis Tait, Endocrinologist and discoverer of aldosterone. (Physics 1945)
- Hassan Ugail, Professor of Visual Computing at the University of Bradford
- Matthew West, technologist
- Jennifer Wilby, Director of the Centre for Systems Studies, University of Hull
- Guy Alfred Wyon, pathologist, researcher, lecturer
- Anne Young (nurse), founder of the first Irish school of general nursing
- Robert Zachary, paediatric surgeon

=== Other ===
- Abdullah Yusuf Ali, translator of the Quran
- Michael Asher, desert explorer and author (English 1977)
- Margaret Atack, professor, head of French, dean of arts and researcher; scholar of WWII and French literature
- Alistair Brownlee, Olympian and ITU Triathlon World Champion (Physiology and Sport 2009)
- Daniel Byles, Guinness World Record-holding ocean rower and polar explorer (Economics and Management Studies 1996)
- Nancy Cruickshank, British entrepreneur in beauty, fashion, and technology
- Abdul Haque Faridi, Bangladeshi academic
- Kat Fletcher, president of the National Union of Students of the United Kingdom, 2004–2006 (Sociology)
- Bagrat Galstanyan, Armenian theologian and cleric, primate of the Diocese of Tavush
- Sir Julian Goose, High Court judge
- Andrew Harrison (born 1970), CEO of Carphone Warehouse
- Lindsay Hawker, British English teacher and murder victim (English, 2006)
- Peter Hendy, Baron Hendy of Richmond Hill, Chairman, Network Rail (Economics & Geography, 1975)
- Richard Hoggart, sociologist and author of The Uses of Literacy (English, 1939)
- Euphemia Steele Innes (1874–1955), Scottish nurse, matron of Leeds General Infirmary for 21 years, principal matron of 2nd Northern General Hospital, founder of Leeds Nurses' League
- Lauren Jeska, transgender fell runner convicted of the attempted murder of Ralph Knibbs (Gender Studies)
- Simon Lee, businessman, Chief Executive of RSA Insurance Group (English and French)
- Debbie McLaren – England, Scotland and Great Britain international rugby union player. Was in the inaugural line-up for each of those three international teams.
- Nicola Mendelsohn, British advertising executive (English and Theatre Studies, 1992)
- Abdullah O. Nasseef, Saudi geologist, chemist and politician
- W. H. New, Professor of English Literature at The University of British Columbia, Officer of the Order of Canada
- Tom Palmer, Rugby Union player
- David Parry, dialectologist who founded the Survey of Anglo-Welsh Dialects
- Ivor Porter, ambassador and author of Operation Autonomous and King Michael (English, 1936)
- Richard Profit, polar explorer (Biology and Management Studies 1996)
- Nourah al-Qahtani, academic and prisoner of conscience (Arabic Literature 2017)
- Subir Raha, Indian business leader (MBA 1985)
- Ken Robinson, educationalist (English and drama, 1972)
- Sir Christopher Rose, former head of the Court of Appeal Criminal Division (LL.B., 1957)
- Jacob Rowan, former captain for the England U20 Rugby Union Team and current player for Gloucester Rugby
- Harold Shipman, general practitioner and convicted serial killer (Medicine, 1970)
- Reynhard Sinaga, Indonesian serial rapist and most prolific rapist in British legal history (Human geography)
- George Martin Stephen, high master of St Paul's School, London (English and History)
- Brigadier Mike Stone, Chief Information Officer of the Ministry of Defence
- Marilyn Stowe, divorce lawyer and the first Chief Assessor and Chief Examiner of the Law Society's Family Law Panel (Law, 1970s)
- Cec Thompson, rugby league player and co-founder of Student Rugby League
- Paul Watson, Pohnpei State football team coach (Italian, 2005)
- Sir Ernest Woodroofe, Chairman of Unilever (1970–1974)

== Staff ==
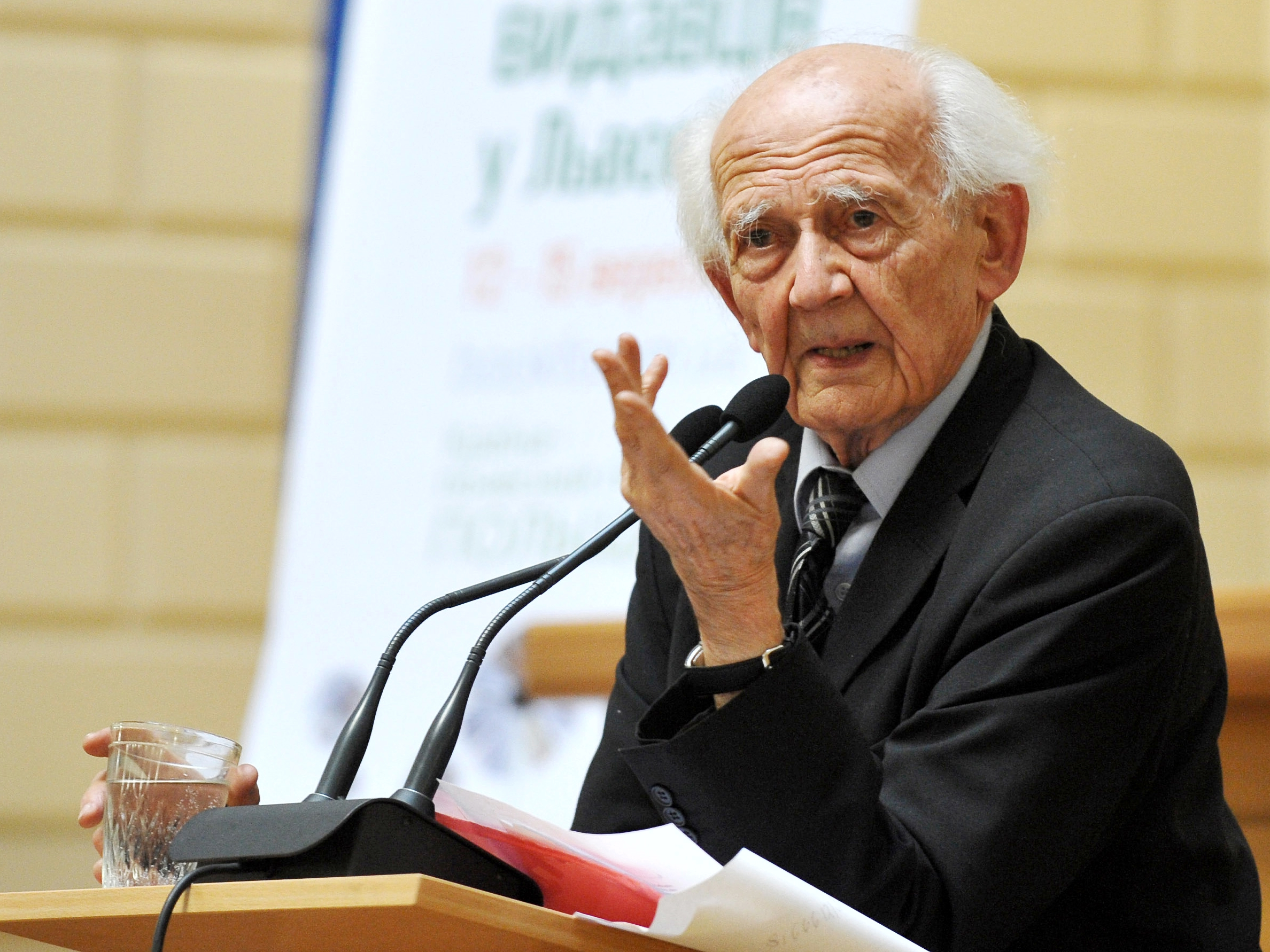
Zygmunt Bauman, sociologist

The following people have been members of staff at the university:

- Lascelles Abercrombie, poet and literary critic (Professor of English literature, 1923–1929)
- William Astbury, physicist and molecular biologist who made pioneering X-ray diffraction studies of biological molecules (Lecturer/Reader in Textile Physics, 1928–1946, Professor of Biomolecular Physics, 1946–61)
- Manuel Barcia, historian (Professor of Global History). Left in 2025 to take up post of Pro-Vice-Chancellor for Global Engagement at the University of Bath.
- Zygmunt Bauman, sociologist
- Maurice Beresford, economic historian, Medieval archaeologist (Economics, 1948–1985)
- Regina Lee Blaszczyk, professor of business history and leadership chair in the history of business and society
- Sir William Henry Bragg, Nobel Prize-winning physicist, chemist (Cavendish Professor of Physics, 1909–1915)
- Asa Briggs, historian
- Dame Lynne Brindley, Chief Executive of British Library and Master of Master of Pembroke College, Oxford (University Librarian, 1997–2000)
- Selig Brodetsky (1888–1954), mathematician, President of the Hebrew University of Jerusalem
- Milena Büchs, professor of sustainable welfare
- Anthony Carrigan (lecturer in postcolonial literature and cultures, 2013–16)
- Anastasios Christodoulou, Deputy Secretary of Leeds University and Foundation Secretary of the Open University
- Pit Corder, professor and applied linguist (1961–1964)
- David Crighton, mathematician (Mathematics, 1974–1985)
- Danny Dorling, Professor of Quantitative Human Geography, 2000-2003
- Peter Geach, philosopher, Professor of Logic 1966–81.
- Norman Greenwood, Australian chemist, and Emeritus Professor
- Geoffrey Hill, poet (English, 1954–1980)
- Geoff Hoon, politician (Law, 1976–1981)
- Jane Ingham, botanist (Research assistant to Joseph Hubert Priestley, 1920–1930)
- Sir Christopher Ingold, chemist
- Benedikt Isserlin, semitist and ancient historian
- Catherine Karkov, art historian
- Susanne Karstedt, criminologist
- Percy Fry Kendall, award-winning geologist (Geology 1904–22)
- Ursula King, scholar of religion and gender
- G. Wilson Knight, literary critic (English)
- Owen Lattimore, pioneer in Chinese studies (Professor of Chinese studies, 1963–1970)
- Irene Manton, botanist and cell biologist (Professor of Biology, 1946–1969)
- David I. Masson, British science-fiction writer (assistant librarian 1938–1939; curator of the Brotherton Collection 1956–1979)
- Duncan McCargo, Professor of Political Science (twice Head of School of Politics and International Studies), 1993–2020
- John Anthony McGuckin, former Reader in Patristic and Byzantine Theology
- Sir Roy Meadow, paediatrician
- Ralph Miliband, political theorist (Professor and Head of Politics department, 1972–1978)
- David Macey, Intellectual historian
- Stan Openshaw, Professor of Human Geography, 1992-1999
- Fred Orton, art historian
- Joseph Hubert Priestley, botanist (Professor of Botany, 1911–1944)
- Sheena Radford, Astbury Professor of Biophysics
- Leonard James Rogers, mathematician (Mathematics 1889–1919)
- James Scott, chair of obstetrics and gynaecology 1961–89
- J. I. M. Stewart, writer, often under the pen name Michael Innes (English, 1930–1935)
- A. R. Taylor, Medieval English, Old Norse and modern Icelandic Studies (1947–1978)
- Philip Thody, writer, editor, translator and Professor of French Literature from 1965 to 1993
- E. P. Thompson, historian (Extramural, 1948–1965)
- J. R. R. Tolkien, writer (English, 1920–1925)
- Stephen Turnbull, military historian
- Philip Wilby, composer, School of Music until 2006
- Fiona Williams, Professor of Social Policy from 1996 to 2012
- Ian N. Wood, historian of the Middle Ages
- Verna Wright, Professor of Rheumatology
- Victor Terence King, professor emeritus of Southeast Asian studies
