= Milena (given name) =

Milena is a Slavic feminine given name. It is derived from the Proto-Slavic mil, meaning 'kind', 'dear'. It is the feminine form of the masculine names Milan and Milen. It is popular in basically all Slavic countries, as well as in other countries like Italy, Brazil, Armenia and Romania. Notable people with the surname include:

== Arts and entertainment ==
- Milena Andonova (born 1959), Bulgarian screenwriter and film director
- Milena Agus (born 1959), Italian writer
- Milena Canonero (born 1946), Italian costume designer
- Milena Ćeranić (born 1986), Serbian pop-folk singer
- Milena Dravić (1940–2018), Serbian actress
- Milena Dvorská (1938–2009), Czech actress
- Milena Ercolani (born 1963), Sammarinese poet and novelist
- Milena Gabanelli (born 1954), Italian journalist and television host
- Milena Gimón (born 1980), Venezuelan sports journalist
- Milena Govich (born 1976), American actress
- Milena Jelinek (1935–2020), Czech-American screenwriter
- Milena Jesenská (1896–1944), Czech journalist, writer and translator
- Milena Kaneva (21st century), Bulgarian film producer and director
- Milena Kitic (born 1968), Serbian American opera singer
- Mila Kunis, born Milena Kunis (born 1983), American-Ukrainian actress
- Milena Miconi (born 1971), Italian actress and model
- Milena Milani (1917–2013), Italian writer, journalist and artist
- Milena Moser (born 1963), Swiss writer
- Milena Nikolova (born 1984), Bulgarian writer
- Milenita, born Milena Nikolova (born 1975), Bulgarian singer
- Milena Palakarkina (born 1959), Bulgarian painter
- Milena Pavlović-Barili (1909–1945), Serbian painter and poet
- Milena Plavšić, Bosnian-born Serbian folk singer
- Milena Rakocević, Serbian fashion photographer
- Rosa Mendes, born Milena Leticia Roucka (born 1979), Canadian professional wrestler
- Milena Salvini (1933–2022), Indian Kathakali dancer
- Milena Sidorova (born 1986), Ukrainian-Dutch choreographer
- Milena Slavova (born 1966), Bulgarian singer
- Milena Smit (born 1996), Spanish actress
- Milena Šoltészová (born 1939), Czech printmaker
- Milena Toscano (born 1984), Brazilian actress and model
- Milena Tscharntke (born 1996), German actress
- Milena Vučić (born 1986), Montenegrin singer
- Milena Vukotic (born 1935), Italian actress
- Milena Warthon (born 2000), Peruvian singer-songwriter
- Milena Zupančič (1946–2026), Slovenian actress

== Sports ==
- Milena Agudelo (born 1985), Colombian pole vaulter
- Milena Bajić (born 1996), Montenegrin basketball player
- Milena Baldassarri (born 2001), Italian rhythmic gymnast
- Milena Balsamo (born 1961), Italian Paralympic athlete
- Milena Bertolini (born 1966), Italian footballer and manager
- Milena Bykova (born 1998), Russian snowboarder
- Milena Čelesnik (1933–2017), Slovenian discus thrower
- Milena Chlumová (born 1946), Czech cross-country skier
- Milena Cillerová (born 1945), Czech cross-country skier
- Milena Dimova (born 1994), Bulgarian volleyball player
- Milena Duchková (born 1952), Czech athlete
- Milena Foltýnová-Gschiessl (1950–1993), Czech handball player
- Milena Gaiga (born 1964), Canadian field hockey player
- Milena Górska (born 2003), Polish rhythmic gymnast
- Milena Greppi (1929–2016), Italian hurdler and sprinter
- Milena Kokosz (born 2001), Polish footballer
- Milena Kordež (born 1953), Slovenian cross-country skier
- Milena Mariano (born 2000), Brazilian rugby sevens player
- Milena Mavrodieva (born 1974), Bulgarian artistic gymnast
- Milena Meisser (born 1979), Swiss snowboarder
- Milena Mesa (born 1993), Cuban handball player
- Milena Milašević (born 1984), Montenegrin athlete
- Milena Müllerová (1923–2009), Czech gymnast
- Milena Nekvapilová (born 1977), Czech tennis player
- Milena Nikolić (born 1992), Bosnian footballer
- Milena Olszewska (born 1984), Polish Paralympic archer
- Milena Pergnerová (born 1975), Czech sprint canoer
- Milena Petkovic (born 1993), Serbian handball player
- Milena Radecka (born 1984), Polish volleyball player
- Milena Raičević (born 1990), Montenegrin handball player
- Milena Rašić (born 1990), Serbian volleyball player
- Milena Rázgová (born 1969), Slovak basketball player
- Milena Reljin (born 1967), Serbian rhythmic gymnast
- Milena Rosner (born 1980), Polish volleyball player
- Milena Salcedo (born 1988), Colombian cyclist
- Milena Strnadová (born 1961), Czech track and field athlete
- Milena Titoneli (born 1998), Brazilian taekwondo practitioner
- Milena Tomayconsa (born 2001), Peruvian footballer
- Milena Trendafilova (born 1970), Bulgarian weightlifter
- Milena Tůmová, Czech ice dancer
- Milena Usenik (1934–2023), Slovenian shot putter
- Milena Venega (born 1996), Cuban rower
- Milena Vuković (born 1986), Serbian footballer

== Politics and diplomacy ==
- Milena Apostolaki (born 1965), Greek politician
- Milena Bićanin (born 1964), Serbian politician
- Milena Calderón Sol de Escalón, Salvadoran politician
- Milena Ćorilić (born 1944), Serbian politician
- Milena Gasperoni (born 1961), Sammarinese politician
- Milena Harito (born 1966), Albanian politician
- Milena Herrera García (born 1975), Spanish politician
- Milena Mayorga (born 1976), Salvadoran diplomat, politician, journalist and model
- Milena Milošević (1950–2016), Serbian politician
- Milena Łukasiewicz (born 1980s), Polish diplomat
- Milena Pires (born 1966), East Timorese politician
- Milena Popović (born 1983), Serbian politician
- Milena Turk (born 1986), Serbian politician
- Milena of Montenegro, born Milena Vukotić (1847–1923), Queen of Montenegro

== Other ==
- Milena Mileva Blažić (born 1956), Slovenian literary historian and professor
- Milena Büchs, German ecological economist
- Milena Doleželová-Velingerová (1932–2012), Czech Sinologist
- Milena Dragićević Šešić (born 1954), Serbian academic
- Milena Glimbovski (born 1990), Russian-German entrepreneur
- Milena Holmgren (born 1966), Chilean ecologist
- Milena Hübschmannová (1933–2005), Czech linguist and Romani scholar
- Milena Králíčková (born 1972), Czech medical doctor and university professor
- Milena Minkova, Bulgarian classical philologist
- Milena Penkowa (born 1973), Danish medical doctor and neuroscientist
- Milena Quaglini (1957–2001), Italian serial killer
- Milena Žic-Fuchs (born 1954), Croatian linguist

== See also ==
- Mileena, a fictional character in the Mortal Kombat franchise
- Milica, a Slavic name
