= Lexical set =

Group of words that fall under a single category

A lexical set is a group of words that share a particular vowel or consonant sound.

A phoneme is a basic unit of sound in a language that can distinguish one word from another. Most commonly, following the work of phonetician John C. Wells, a lexical set is a class of words in a language that share a certain vowel phoneme. As Wells himself says, lexical sets "enable one to refer concisely to large groups of words which tend to share the same vowel, and to the vowel which they share". For instance, the pronunciation of the vowel in cup, luck, sun, blood, glove, and tough may vary in different English dialects but is usually consistent within each dialect and so the category of words forms a lexical set, which Wells, for ease, calls the STRUT set. Meanwhile, words like bid, cliff, limb, miss, etc. form a separate lexical set: Wells's KIT set. Originally, Wells developed 24 such labels—keywords—for the vowel lexical sets of English, which have been sometimes modified and expanded by himself or other scholars for various reasons. Lexical sets have also been used to describe the vowels of other languages, such as French, Irish and Scots.

There are several reasons why lexical sets are useful. Scholars of phonetics often use abstract symbols (most universally today, those of the International Phonetic Alphabet) to transcribe phonemes, but they may follow different transcribing conventions or rely on implicit assumptions in their exact choice of symbols. One convenience of lexical sets is their tendency to avoid these conventions or assumptions. Instead, Wells explains, they "make use of keywords intended to be unmistakable no matter what accent one says them in". That makes them useful for examining phonemes within an accent, comparing and contrasting different accents, and capturing how phonemes may be differently distributed based on accent. A further benefit is that people with no background in phonetics can identify a phoneme not by learned symbols or technical jargon but by its simple keyword (like STRUT or KIT in the above examples).

== Standard lexical sets for English ==
The standard lexical sets for English introduced by John C. Wells in his 1982 Accents of English are in wide usage. Wells defined each lexical set on the basis of the pronunciation of words in two reference accents, which he calls RP and GenAm.

- "RP" refers to Received Pronunciation, the traditionally prestigious accent in England.
- "GenAm" refers to an accent of the General American type, which is associated with a geographically "neutral" or widespread sound system throughout the US.

Wells classifies English words into 24 lexical sets on the basis of the pronunciation of the vowel of their stressed syllable in the two reference accents. Typed in small caps, each lexical set is named after a representative keyword. Wells also describes three sets of words based on word-final unstressed vowels (the final three sets listed in the chart below), which, though not included in the standard 24 lexical sets "have indexical and diagnostic value in distinguishing accents".

Lexical sets, as defined in Wells (1982), pp. xviii–ix, 120–2, 166–7
Keyword	RP	GA	Example words
KIT	ɪ	ɪ	ship, sick, bridge, milk, myth, busy
DRESS	e	ɛ	step, neck, edge, shelf, friend, ready
TRAP	æ	æ	tap, back, badge, scalp, hand, cancel
LOT	ɒ	ɑ	stop, sock, dodge, romp, possible, quality
STRUT	ʌ	ʌ	cup, suck, budge, pulse, trunk, blood
FOOT	ʊ	ʊ	put, bush, full, good, look, wolf
BATH	ɑː	æ	staff, brass, ask, dance, sample, calf
CLOTH	ɒ	ɔ	cough, broth, cross, long, Boston
NURSE	ɜː	ɜr	hurt, lurk, urge, burst, jerk, term
FLEECE	iː	i	creep, speak, leave, feel, key, people
FACE	eɪ	eɪ	tape, cake, raid, veil, steak, day
PALM	ɑː	ɑ	psalm, father, bra, spa, lager
THOUGHT	ɔː	ɔ	taught, sauce, hawk, jaw, broad
GOAT	əʊ	oʊ	soap, joke, home, know, so, roll
GOOSE	uː	u	loop, shoot, tomb, mute, huge, view
PRICE	aɪ	aɪ	ripe, write, arrive, high, try, buy
CHOICE	ɔɪ	ɔɪ	adroit, noise, join, toy, royal
MOUTH	aʊ	aʊ	out, loud, house, count, crowd, cow
NEAR	ɪə	ɪr	beer, sincere, fear, beard, serum
SQUARE	ɛə	ɛr	care, fair, pear, where, scarce, vary
START	ɑː	ɑr	far, sharp, bark, carve, farm, heart
NORTH	ɔː	ɔr	for, war, short, scorch, born, warm
FORCE	ɔː	or	four, wore, sport, porch, borne, story
CURE	ʊə	ʊr	poor, tourist, pure, plural, jury
happY	ɪ	ɪ	copy, scampi, taxi, sortie, committee, hockey, Chelsea
lettER	ə	ər	paper, metre, calendar, stupor, succo(u)r, martyr
commA	ə	ə	catalpa, quota, vodka

For example, the word rod is pronounced /ˈrɒd/ in RP and /ˈrɑd/ in GenAm. It therefore belongs in the LOT lexical set. Weary is pronounced /ˈwɪərɪ/ in RP and /ˈwɪrɪ/ in GenAm and thus belongs in the NEAR lexical set.

Some English words do not belong to any lexical set. For example, the a in the stressed syllable of tomato is pronounced /ɑː/ in RP, and /eɪ/ in GenAm, a combination that is very unusual and is not covered by any of the 27 lexical sets above. Some words pronounced with /ɒ/ before a velar consonant in RP, such as mock and fog, belong to no particular lexical set because the GenAm pronunciation varies between /ɔ/ and /ɑ/.

The GenAm FLEECE, FACE, GOOSE, and GOAT range between monophthongal [i, e, u, o] and diphthongal [ɪi, eɪ, ʊu, oʊ], and Wells chose to phonemicize three of them as monophthongs for the sake of simplicity and FACE as /eɪ/ to avoid confusion with RP DRESS, /e/.

The happY set was identified phonemically as the same as KIT for both RP and GenAm, reflecting the then-traditional analysis, although realizations similar to FLEECE (happy tensing) were already taking hold in both varieties. The notation ⟨i⟩ for happY has since emerged and been taken up by major pronouncing dictionaries, including Wells's, to take note of this shift. Wells's model of General American is also conservative in that it lacks the cot–caught (LOT–THOUGHT) and horse–hoarse (NORTH–FORCE) mergers.

=== Choice of the keywords ===
Wells explains his choice of keywords ("kit", "fleece", etc.) as follows:

The keywords have been chosen in such a way that clarity is maximized: whatever accent of English they are spoken in, they can hardly be mistaken for other words. Although fleece is not the commonest of words, it cannot be mistaken for a word with some other vowel; whereas beat, say, if we had chosen it instead, would have been subject to the drawback that one man's pronunciation of beat may sound like another's pronunciation of bait or bit.

Wherever possible, the keywords end in a voiceless alveolar or dental consonant.

=== Usage ===
The standard lexical sets of Wells are widely used to discuss the phonological and phonetic systems of different accents of English in a clear and concise manner. Although based solely on RP and GenAm, the standard lexical sets have proven useful in describing many other accents of English. This is true because, in many dialects, the words in all or most of the sets are pronounced with similar or identical stressed vowels. Wells himself uses the Lexical Sets most prominently to give "tables of lexical incidence" for all the various accents he discusses in his work. For example, here is the table of lexical incidence he gives for Newfoundland English:

- KIT: ɪ
- DRESS: ɛ
- TRAP: æ
- LOT: ɑ
- STRUT: ɔ̈
- FOOT: ʊ
- BATH: æː
- CLOTH: ɑː
- NURSE: ɜr [ɝ:]
- FLEECE: iː
- FACE: ɛː, ɛɪ
- PALM: æ, ɑː
- THOUGHT: ɑː
- GOAT: ʌʊ
- GOOSE: uː
- PRICE: əi
- CHOICE: əi
- MOUTH: əu
- NEAR: ɛr
- SQUARE: ɛr
- START: ær
- NORTH: ɔ̈r
- FORCE: ɔ̈r
- CURE: ɔ̈r
- happY: [i]
- lettER: ər [ɚ]
- commA: ə

The table indicates that, for example, Newfoundland English uses the /ɪ/ phoneme for words in the KIT lexical set, and that the NORTH, FORCE and CURE sets are all pronounced with the same vowel /ɔ̈r/. Note that some lexical sets, such as FACE, are given with more than one pronunciation, which indicates that not all words in the FACE lexical set are pronounced similarly (in this case, Newfoundland English has not fully undergone the pane–pain merger). /ɔ̈/ is a back vowel [ɔ]; Wells uses the symbol ⟨ɔ̈⟩ so that the reader does not confuse it with the THOUGHT vowel (which, in the case of many other accents, he writes with ⟨ɔ⟩ or ⟨ɔː⟩).

Wells also uses the standard lexical sets to refer to "the vowel sound used for the standard lexical set in question in the accent under discussion": Thus, for example, in describing the Newfoundland accent, Wells writes that "KIT and DRESS are reportedly often merged as [ɪ]", meaning that the stressed syllables of words in the KIT lexical set and words in the DRESS lexical set are reportedly often pronounced identically with the vowel [ɪ].

Lexical sets may also be used to describe splits and mergers. For example, RP, along with most other non-rhotic accents, pronounces words such as "father" and "farther" identically. This can be described more economically as the merger of the PALM and START lexical sets. Most North American accents make "father" rhyme with "bother". This can be described as the merger of the PALM and LOT lexical sets.

=== Origin ===
In a 2010 blog post, Wells wrote:

I sometimes think that a century from now my lexical sets will be the one thing I shall be remembered for. Yet I dreamt them up over a weekend, frustrated with the incoherent mess of symbols used in such contemporary publications as Weinreich's "Is a structural dialectology possible?".

He also wrote that he claimed no copyright in the standard lexical sets, and that everyone was "free to make whatever use of them they wish".

=== Extensions ===
Some varieties of English make distinctions in stressed vowels that are not captured by the 24 lexical sets. For example, some Irish and Scottish accents that have not undergone the fern–fir–fur merger split the NURSE lexical set into multiple subsets. For such accents, Wells's 24 lexical sets may be inadequate. Because of this, a work devoted to Irish English may split the Wells NURSE set into two subsets, a new, smaller NURSE set and a TERM set.

Some writers on English accents have introduced a GOAL set to refer to a set of words that have the GOAT vowel in standard accents but may have a different vowel in Sheffield or in south-east London. Wells has stated that he didn't include a GOAL set because this should be interpreted as an allophone of GOAT that is sensitive to the morpheme boundary, which he illustrates by comparing the London pronunciations of goalie and slowly.

Schneider et al. (2004), which documents the phonologies of varieties of English around the world like Wells (1982), employs Wells's standard lexical sets as well as the following supplementary lexical sets, as needed to illustrate finer details of the variety under discussion:

- GOAL, discussed above
- horsES, officEs, paintEd and villAge, all referring to the unstressed allophone of KIT that is subject to the weak vowel merger
- MARY, MARRY and MERRY, for the allophones of FACE (SQUARE in non-rhotic dialects), TRAP and DRESS before intervocalic /r/, commonly subject to Mary–marry–merry merger in North American English
- MIRROR and NEARER, for the allophones of KIT and FLEECE before intervocalic /r/, commonly subject to mirror–nearer merger in North American English
- treacLE and uncLE, both referring to the vocalized /əl/

Other supplementary lexical sets include:

- PASTA, pronounced the same as TRAP in the UK and as PALM in the US (the opposite of the BATH vowel)
- OFF, which is the same as Wells's CLOTH.
- HEAD, BIRTH, BERTH, PRIZE, AFTER, NEVER, STAY, STONE, STAND, DO, ONE, SNOW, BOAR, POWER, FIRE, EARS, TUESDAY, NEW, ORANGE, KITTEN, DANCE, TOMORROW, LOUD, HAND, PIN, PEN, THINK, LENGTH, GOING, POOL, PULL, FEEL, FILL, FAIL, FELL, COW, STAR, FIT, CUP, PIECE, BROAD, LOOSE, EIGHT, metER, BEER, BARE, BACK, BED, TERM, SPHERE, ZERO, carrIER, cordIAL, cUrious, TRUER, TRUANT, About, IT, SIT, LAYER, BITE, BIDE, BYRE, BILE, BOUT, BOWED, BOWER, BOWEL, DOOR, POOR

=== Adaptation for Anglo-Welsh dialects ===
In his work for the Survey of Anglo-Welsh Dialects, David Parry adapted Wells's lexical sets for Anglo-Welsh dialects.

Lexical sets, as defined in Parry (1999), pp. 8–9.
Keyword	Equivalent Wells' set	Example words
BRIDGE	KIT	bitch, bridge, finger, shilling, squirrel, thimble, whip, with
KETTLE	DRESS	buried, deaf, kettle, second, twelve, yellow
APPLES	TRAP	apples, hand, ladder, lamb, man, rabbits, rat, saddle, that, thatch
SUCK	STRUT, (COMMA)	butter, furrow, jump, none, nothing, one, onions, suck, uncle
DOG	CLOTH, (LOT)	cross, dog, fox, holly, off, porridge, quarry, trough, wash, wasps, wrong
BULL	FOOT	bull, butcher, foot, put, sugar, woman, wool
SHEEP	FLEECE	cheese, geese, grease, key, pea, sheaf, sheep, weasel, weeds, wheel, yeast
GATE	FACE	bacon, break, clay, drain, gate, lay (verb), potatoes, spade, tail, take, waistcoat, weigh
WORK	NURSE	first, heard, third, work (noun)
MARE	SQUARE	chair, hare, mare, pears
ARM	START, PALM, BATH	arm, branch, calf, chaff, draught, farmer, farthing, grass
STRAW	THOUGHT, NORTH	forks, morning, saw-dust, slaughter-house, straw, walk
FOAL	GOAT	coal, cold, colt, comb, foal, oak, old, road, sholder, snow, spokes, toad, yolk
GOOSE		dew, ewe, goose, hoof, root, stool, tooth, Tuesday, two
WHITE	PRICE	eye, fight, flies (noun, plural), hive, ivy, mice, white
OIL	CHOICE	boiling, oil, voice
COW	MOUTH	cow, plough, snout, sow (noun), thousand
EARS	NEAR	ears, hear, year
BOAR	FORCE	boar, door, four
FIRE	PRICE + historical /r/	fire, iron
HOUR	MOUTH + historical /r/	flour, hour

== See also ==
- Diaphoneme
- Homophone
- Minimal pair

== Bibliography ==
- Cruttenden, Alan (2014). Gimson's Pronunciation of English (8th ed.). Routledge. ISBN 978-0-415-72174-5.
- Parry, David (1999). A Grammar and Glossary of the Conservative Anglo-Welsh Dialects of Rural Wales. Sheffield: The National Centre for English Cultural Tradition.
- Schneider, Edgar W.; Burridge, Kate; Kortmann, Bernd; Mesthrie, Rajend; Upton, Clive (2004). A Handbook of Varieties of English. Vol. 1: Phonology. Mouton de Gruyter. ISBN 978-3-11-017532-5.
- Wells, John C. (1982). Accents of English. Vol. 1: An Introduction (pp. i–xx, 1–278), Vol. 2: The British Isles (pp. i–xx, 279–466), Vol. 3: Beyond the British Isles (pp. i–xx, 467–674). Cambridge University Press. doi:10.1017/CBO9780511611759, doi:10.1017/CBO9780511611766. ISBN 0-52129719-2, 0-52128540-2, 0-52128541-0.
