= BBC Pronunciation Unit =

The BBC Pronunciation Unit, also known as the BBC Pronunciation Research Unit, is an arm of the British Broadcasting Corporation (BBC) comprising linguists (phoneticians) whose role is "to research and advise on the pronunciation of any words, names or phrases in any language required by anyone in the BBC". It does not concern itself with promoting any accent, despite the popular association between Received Pronunciation and the BBC. Its predecessor was the BBC Advisory Committee on Spoken English, which existed from 1926 to 1939.

== Advisory Committee on Spoken English ==
The Advisory Committee on Spoken English was founded by John Reith, the BBC's first managing editor, with the intent to "maintain a standard of educated Southern English". The founding members were:

- Robert Bridges, poet (chairman)
- Logan Pearsall Smith, literary scholar
- George Bernard Shaw, playwright
- Daniel Jones, phonetician
- Johnston Forbes-Robertson, actor
- Arthur Lloyd James, phonetician (honorary secretary)

It held meetings a few times a year to decide on "general principles" of pronunciation for announcers, and "rulings" on "doubtful words", which were published in the Radio Times. Its initial aim was prescriptive, but it increasingly sought public opinion in the Radio Times. It published Broadcast English, a series of seven booklets documenting recommended pronunciations of specific words, chiefly place names, from 1928 to 1939. The pronunciation of place names was crowdsourced. In 1928, 1,946 letters surveying pronunciation were sent to educated people, such as postmasters and vicars, in villages, 94.5% of which were returned. In 1929, Lloyd James invited readers of the Radio Times to submit their pronunciation of place names, and received at least 1,500 letters and postcards. The lexicographical work was mostly done by a "specialist sub-committee" made up of Jones, Lloyd James, Henry Cecil Kennedy Wyld, and Harold Orton. The committee was suspended in 1939 due to the outbreak of World War II.

The committee originally used an ad hoc respelling system for representing English pronunciation, but it later adopted the International Phonetic Alphabet and a more systematic respelling system.

== Pronunciation Unit ==
The committee was replaced by a team consisting of Lloyd James and Jones, who remained "linguistic advisors" to the BBC until their deaths, and two former assistant secretaries of the committee, Gertrude M. "Elizabeth" Miller and Elspeth D. Anderson. The day-to-day work was taken over by Miller and Anderson. The team became known as the BBC Pronunciation Unit in the early 1940s.

As of 2008, the unit consisted of three phoneticians, and the database it maintains had more than 200,000 entries. Part of its work has been published as pronouncing dictionaries, the BBC Pronouncing Dictionary of British Names (1971, edited by Miller), revised by Graham Pointon in 1983, and the Oxford BBC Guide to Pronunciation (2006), edited by Lena Olausson and Catherine Sangster, both published by Oxford University Press (OUP). The former used the IPA and the BBC's own respelling. The latter used OUP's IPA scheme, devised by Clive Upton in the 1990s, and OUP's respelling.

== See also ==
- Received Pronunciation

== Bibliography ==
- Collins, Beverly; Mees, Inger M. (1998). The Real Professor Higgins: The Life and Career of Daniel Jones. Berlin: Mouton de Gruyter. ISBN 3-11-015124-3.
- Pointon, Graham (1988). "The BBC and English pronunciation". English Today. 4 (3): 8–12. doi:10.1017/S0266078400003448.
- Sangster, Catherine (2008). "The Work of the BBC Pronunciation Unit in the 21st Century". Arbeiten aus Anglistik und Amerikanistik. 33 (2): 251–261. JSTOR 26430874.
- Schwyter, Jürg Rainer (2008). "Setting a Standard: Early BBC Language Policy and the Advisory Committee on Spoken English". Arbeiten aus Anglistik und Amerikanistik. 33 (2): 217–250. JSTOR 26430874.
- Schwyter, Jürg R. (2016). Dictating to the Mob: The History of the BBC Advisory Committee on Spoken English. Oxford University Press. ISBN 978-0-19-873673-8.
- Windsor Lewis, Jack (1984). "G. B. Pointon, BBC Pronouncing Dictionary of British Names". Journal of the International Phonetic Association. 14 (2): 86–89. doi:10.1017/S0025100300002826.
- Windsor Lewis, Jack (2008). "Lena Olausson & Catherine Sangster, Oxford BBC guide to pronunciation". Journal of the International Phonetic Association. 38 (2): 203–208. doi:10.1017/S0025100308003484. Archived from the original on 27 February 2025.
