= Clive Upton =

English linguist

Clive Upton (born 30 September 1946) is an English linguist specializing in dialectology and sociolinguistics. He is also an authority on the pronunciation of English. He has been Emeritus Professor of Modern English Language at the University of Leeds since 2012.

== Education ==
Upton was born in Solihull, England, and was educated at Solihull School (1956–65). He holds a BA and a MA from the University of Wales (Swansea) (now Swansea University) and a PhD from the University of Leeds, where he was Professor of Modern English Language from 2006 to 2012.

== Career ==
Upton's research in dialectology began at Swansea, where as an MA student he was one of the original fieldworkers on the Survey of Anglo-Welsh Dialects (SAWD). After a lectureship at the University of Malawi, he began his long association with the Survey of English Dialects (SED) at the University of Leeds, where he joined the Institute of Dialect and Folk Life Studies as a research assistant to Harold Orton on the Survey's Linguistic Atlas of England. After he received his PhD from Leeds in 1977, appointments at the Papua New Guinea University of Technology, the University of Birmingham and the University of Sheffield followed. He returned to Leeds in 1997, where he became Professor of Modern English language in 2006 and Professor Emeritus upon his retirement in 2012. Upton has contributed to a number of major publications on English dialectology which draw on SED materials. He co-authored Survey of English Dialects: The Dictionary and Grammar (London: Routledge, 1994) with David Parry and John Widdowson, and An Atlas of English Dialects (Oxford: OUP, 1996 and London: Routledge, 2006) with Widdowson.

Between 2002 and 2005 Upton, with Oliver Pickering, led the Leeds Archive of Vernacular Culture (LAVC) project, which made the collections of the former Institute of Dialect and Folk Life Studies accessible to those with interests in the speech, customs, beliefs and practices of traditional British communities.

In 2004–2005 he was academic adviser to the BBC's "Voices" project. Local radio journalists collected examples of speech from around the country, and Upton coordinated the group which analysed the data generated by the initiative. The findings were published in Analysing Twenty-first Century British English (London: Routledge, 2013), co-edited with Bethan L. Davies. Upton worked with the British Library to make the "Voices" material widely available. Many of the recordings are now accessible, alongside other accent and dialect materials (including substantial material from the SED), on the library's Sounds site.

In addition to his work in dialectology, Upton has been a pronunciation consultant for Oxford University Press since 1993. His revised version of the Received Pronunciation model is used in the Oxford English Dictionary (OED), the Shorter Oxford English Dictionary, the Concise Oxford English Dictionary, and the New Oxford Dictionary of English.

He is also responsible for the British element of the Oxford Dictionary of Pronunciation for Current English (2001) and its second edition, The Routledge Dictionary of Pronunciation for Current English (2017). With his son Eben Upton, he is co-author of the Oxford Rhyming Dictionary (2004). He was editor of the Cambridge University Press journal English Today from 2013 to 2017.

As of September 2022, he is the editor of the Transactions of the Yorkshire Dialect Society, an annual publication.

== Personal life ==
Clive Upton is married to Lesley. They have two children, a son Eben (b. 1978) and a daughter Stevie (b. 1981). Eben is the lead developer of the Raspberry Pi computer.

== Selected publications ==
- 1994. Survey of English Dialects: The Dictionary and Grammar. London and New York: Routledge [with David Parry and J.D.A. Widdowson].
- 2001. The Oxford Dictionary of Pronunciation for Current English. Oxford: Oxford University Press [with William A. Kretzschmar Jr and Rafal Konopka].
- 2004. A Handbook of Varieties of English: A Multimedia Reference Tool. 2 volumes plus CD-Rom. Berlin: Mouton de Gruyter [ed., with Edgar W. Schneider, Kate Burridge, Bernd Kortmann, and Rajend Mesthrie].
- 2004. The Oxford Rhyming Dictionary. Oxford: Oxford University Press [with Eben Upton].
- 2006 [1996]. An Atlas of English Dialects. 2nd edn. London: Routledge [with J.D.A. Widdowson].
- 2008. "Received Pronunciation'", in Bernd Kortmann and Clive Upton (eds), Varieties of English 1: The British Isles. Berlin: Mouton de Gruyter, 269–282.
- 2010. "Designing maps for non-Linguists", in Alfred Lameli, Roland Kehrein, and Stefan Rabanus (eds), An International Handbook of Linguistic Variation, Volume 2: Language Mapping. Berlin: De Gruyter Mouton, 142–157.
- 2010. Joseph Wright's English Dialect Dictionary and Beyond. Frankfurt am Main: Peter Lang [ed., with Manfred Markus and Reinhard Heuberger].
- 2010. "Language ideological debates on the BBC 'Voices' website: hypermodality in theory and practice", in Sally Johnson and Tommaso Milani, eds, Language Ideologies and Media Discourse: Texts, Practices, Politics. London: Continuum, 223–251 [with Sally Johnson and Tommaso Milani].
- 2012 [2006]. "Modern Regional English in the British Isles", in Lynda Mugglestone, ed., The Oxford History of the English Language. 2nd edition. Oxford: Oxford University Press, 379–414.
- 2012. "An Evolving Standard British English Pronunciation Model", in Raymond Hickey, ed., Standards of English: Codified Varieties around the World. Cambridge: Cambridge University Press, 55–71.
- 2013. Analysing 21st-century British English: Conceptual and methodological aspects of the BBC 'Voices' project. London: Routledge [ed., with Bethan L. Davies].
- 2013. "Analyzing the BBC Voices data: Contemporary English dialect areas and their characteristic lexical variants". Literary and Linguistic Computing 2013 [with Martijn Wieling].
- 2015 [1987]. Word Maps: A Dialect Atlas of England. Routledge Library Editions: The English Language, Volume 27. London: Routledge [with Stewart Sanderson and John Widdowson].
- 2015. "British English", in Marnie Reed and John Levis, eds, The Handbook of English Pronunciation. Malden MA and Oxford: Wiley Blackwell, 251–268.
- 2016. "Regional and Dialect Dictionaries", in Philip Durkin, ed., The Oxford Handbook of Lexicography. Oxford: Oxford University Press, 381–392.
- 2017. The Routledge Dictionary of Pronunciation for Current English. London: Routledge [with William A. Kretzschmar Jr].
