= Petković =

Petković (Serbian Cyrillic: Петковић, pronounced [pêtkoʋitɕ]) is a Croatian, Bosnian, Montenegrin and Serbian surname. It may refer to:

- Alexander Petkovic (born 1980), German boxer
- Andrea Petkovic (born 1987), German tennis player
- Antonio Petković (born 1986), Croatian water polo player
- Bratislav Petković (1948–2021), Serbian politician
- Bruno Petković (born 1994), Croatian footballer
- Danijel Petković (born 1993), Montenegrin footballer
- Dejan Petković (born 1972), Serbian footballer and football pundit
- Dejan Petković (singer) (born 1958), Serbian singer
- Dušan Petković (footballer, born 1903) (1903–1979), Yugoslavian footballer
- Dušan Petković (footballer, born 1974), Serbian footballer
- Dušan Petković (volleyball) (born 1992), Serbian volleyball player
- Duško Petković (born 1990), Serbian footballer
- Eva Haljecka Petković (1870–1947), Serbian gynecologist, activist
- Goran Petković (born 1975), Serbian footballer
- Igor Petković (born 1983), Serbian/Montenegrin footballer
- Ilija Petković (1945–2020), Serbian footballer
- Ivana Petković (born 1985), Croatian handball player
- Jackeline Petkovic (born 1980), Brazilian model, singer, actress and television host
- Jason Petkovic (born 1972), Australian soccer player
- Lazar Petković (born 1995), Serbian footballer
- Marija Petković (1892–1966), Croatian Catholic nun
- Marinko Petković (born 1976), Serbian footballer
- Marjan Petković (born 1979), German footballer
- Marko Petković (born 1992), Serbian footballer
- Marko Petković (water polo) (born 1989), Montenegrin water polo player
- Michael Petkovic (born 1976), Australian soccer player
- Mile Petković (born 1953), Croatian professional football manager
- Milena Petkovic (born 1993), Serbian handball player
- Milivoj Petković (born 1949), Bosnian Croat army officer
- Miloje Petković (born 1967), Serbian footballer
- Miodrag Petković (born 1948), Serbian mathematician and computer scientist
- Miroslav Petković (born 1968), Serbian politician
- Momir Petković (born 1953), Serbian Olympic wrestling champion
- Nikola Petković (footballer, born 1986) (born 1986), Chinese footballer
- Nikola Petković (footballer, born 1996) (born 1996), Serbian footballer
- Nikola Petković (footballer, born 2003) (born 2003), Serbian footballer
- Nina Petković (born 1981), Montenegrin singer
- Petar Petković (born 1980), Serbian politician
- Radomir Petković (born 1986), Serbian wrestler
- Ranko Petković (born 1947), Bosnian and Yugoslav footballer
- Stojanka Petković (born 1959), Serbian politician
- Tihomir Petković (born 1958), Serbian politician
- Veljko Petković (footballer) (born 2000), American soccer player
- Veljko Petković (volleyball) (born 1977), Serbian volleyball player
- Vladislav Petković Dis (1880–1917), Serbian impressionist poet
- Vladimir Petković (born 1963), Bosnian football manager
- Vladimir Petković (art historian) (1874–1956), Serbian art historian
- Vladimir Petković (politician) (born 1979), Serbian politician
- Vladimir K. Petković (1873–1935), Serbian geologist
- Vlado Petković (born 1983), Serbian volleyball player
- Zlata Petković (1954–2012), Yugoslav and Serbian actress
- Zoran Petković, Bosnian-born tennis coach and former player
