= St Hild's Church of England School =

Location
- King Oswy Drive; West View; Hartlepool; County Durham, TS24 9PB; England
- Coordinates: 54.71014°N 1.2326°W

Information
- Type: Academy
- Religious affiliation: Church of England
- School district: Hartlepool Borough Council
- Local authority: Hartlepool Borough Council
- Trust: NEAT Academy Trust
- Department for Education URN: 148532 Tables
- Ofsted: Reports
- Headteacher: Paul Martin
- Gender: Mixed
- Age: 11 to 16
- Enrolment: 670 as of May 2025
- Capacity: 991 as of May 2025
- Houses: St. Aidan's St. Bede’s St. Cuthbert's St. Oswald's
- Website: https://sthilds.neat.org.uk/

St Hild's Church of England School (formerly Henry Smith School) is a mixed secondary school located in the West View area of Hartlepool, County Durham, England. The school is named after Saint Hild of Whitby, the founding abbess of the monastery at Whitby.

St Hild's Church of England School was established in September 2001 replacing Henry Smith School on the same site with the same pupils. The school relocated to a new building on the same road a few years later. The school also gained specialism in engineering.

Previously a voluntary aided school administered by Hartlepool Borough Council, in April 2021 St Hild's Church of England School converted to academy status. The school is now sponsored by the NEAT Academy Trust, however it continues to be a Church of England school under the direction of the Diocese of Durham.

St Hild's Church of England School mainly admits pupils from Barnard Grove Primary School, Clavering Primary School, St Helen's Primary School, Throston Primary School and West View Primary School. The school offers GCSEs as programmes of study for pupils.

== Notable pupils ==
- John Brackstone, footballer who played in the Football League for Hartlepool United and Darlington
- Stephen Brackstone, older brother of John who played professional football for York City
- John McGovern, footballer who won the European Cup twice with Nottingham Forest
- Dorothy Robson, physicist and engineer during World War II
