= Eugen Dieth =

Swiss linguist, phonetician and dialectologist

- Born: 18 November 1893; Neukirch an der Thur, Thurgau, Switzerland
- Died: 24 May 1956 (aged 62); Zollikon, Zurich, Switzerland
- Occupations: Linguist, Phonetician

Eugen Dieth (18 November 1893, in Neukirch an der Thur – 24 May 1956, in Zollikon) was a Swiss linguist, phonetician and dialectologist. He is well known for his work in English and German phonetics, and for co-initiating the Survey of English Dialects.

== Biography ==
Eugen Dieth studied General Linguistics, English and German at the University of Zurich and the University of Geneva. He earned his PhD in 1919 with a dissertation on Middle English syntax. Between 1922 and 1927 he was lecturer in German in Aberdeen. In 1927 he became Professor extraordinarius and in 1947 Professor ordinarius for English, Old Norse and General Phonetics at the University of Zurich. He founded the Phonetics Laboratory of the University of Zurich in 1935. Between 1927 and 1936 he worked as a part-time editor for the Schweizerisches Idiotikon and between 1934 and his unexpected death from a stroke in 1956 he was the director of the Phonogram Archives of the University of Zurich. He married Hilde Martha Bachmann, the daughter of the Swiss professor of German Philology at the University of Zurich, Albert Bachmann, in 1951.

== Achievements ==
Eugen Dieth published an orthographic handbook for Swiss German in 1938, entitled Schwyzertütschi Dialäktschrift (= Swiss German Dialect Orthography). His system of spelling Swiss German is commonly referred to as Dieth-Schreibung. It postulates that the vernacular spelling ought to reflect the phonological characteristics and individuality of the various Swiss dialects. It can therefore be characterized as a system of phonetic transcription meant to be used by lay people. In its less strict form, it tries to limit itself to the usage of the letters and diacritics that are available on a simple typing machine.

In 1950 he published his Vademekum der Phonetik, a textbook classic in German-speaking phonetics.

As professor of English, he was also very active in the field of dialectology in Britain. His description of the dialect of Buchan was an important contribution to Scottish dialectology. More importantly, however, he initiated the work for the Survey of English Dialects and compiled—together with Harold Orton—the Questionnaire for a Linguistic Atlas of England.

== Selected works ==
- Dieth, Eugen (1932). A Grammar of the Buchan Dialect (Aberdeenshire). Cambridge: University Press.
- Dieth, Eugen (1938). Schwyzertütschi Dialäktschrift. Leitfaden einer einheitlichen Schreibweise für alle Dialekte. Zürich: Orell Füssli.
- Dieth, Eugen (1950). Vademekum der Phonetik. Phonetische Grundlagen für das wissenschaftliche und praktische Studium der Sprachen. Bern: Francke.
- Dieth, Eugen and Harold Orton (1952). A Questionnaire for a Linguistic Atlas of England. Leeds: Leeds Philosophical and Literary Society.
