= Christina Jackson =

British civil engineer

Christina Jackson is a British civil engineer specializing in geotechnical engineering. She is a Chartered Engineer (CEng) and a Fellow of the Institution of Civil Engineers (ICE) and Professor in the School of Engineering at the University of Birmingham. Her work has included coordinating the treatment of abandoned limestone workings in the Black Country, leading land reclamation and contributing to major works on the M40 and M6 Toll. Jackson became the first woman elected chair at the Institution of Civil Engineers West Midlands in 2004.

== Education ==
Jackson received a BSc from the University of Leeds and a master's degree from Cornell University, in Civil and Geotechnical Engineering respectively.

== Career ==
- 1978–1980: Ove Arup as a graduate engineer.
- 1980–1982: Cornell University as a graduate teaching and research assistant.
- 1983–2009: Ove Arup in Midlands, started as Geotechnical engineer and promoted to senior Geotechnical engineer, then Regional associate to associate director.
- 2009–2016: Amey as principal Engineering Manager and Technical Director to Geotechnical department.
- 2015–present: Royal Academy of Engineering, Visiting professor of Asset Management in the School of Engineering, at University of Birmingham.
- 2016 onwards: CH2M/Jacobs, Birmingham as a Technical Director to the Geotechnical department.

== Awards ==
- Shortlisted for the WISE Award for Leadership and Inspiration in 2012.
- 2015 recipient of the Lifetime achievement in engineering award from Women in Construction and Engineering.
- Chartered Institution of Highways & Transportation West Midlands Awards 2019 Winner for Best Large Project for the Worcester Battenhall Rail Bridge.
- Judge for the 2019 the WICE awards (European Women In Construction & Engineering Awards).

== Selected publications ==
- Stas, C.V., and Kulhawy, F.H. Critical evaluation of design methods for foundations under axial uplift and compression loading. Final report. United States: N. p., 1984. Web.
- Jackson CV and Braithwaite PA (1988). The identification of abandoned limestone mines by site investigation methods. Proceedings of 2nd International Conference on Construction in Areas of Abandoned Mine Workings, June 1988. Engineering Technical Press, Edinburgh.
- Kulhawy FH, Jackson C and Mayene PW (1989), First order estimation of ko in Sands and Clays. Foundation engineering: Current Principles and Practices, Volume 1 ASGE, New York
- Kulhway FH and Jackson C V (1989), Some observations on Untrained Side Resistance of Drilled Shafts. Foundations Engineering: Current Principles and Practices, Volume 2, ASCE, New York
- Jackson CV (1996), Stabilisation of Cow Pasture Limestone Mine, Sandwell, West Midlands. International Conference on Environmental Management of Mining Operations, London September 1996, BC UK Conferences Limited.
- Jackson C, Lamont-Black J, Alder D and White C (2015), “Embankment failure remediation on the M5 junction 7 – a case history of electrokinetic treatment” XVI European Conference on Soil Mechanics and Geotechnical Engineering, Edinburgh 2015.
