= Matthew West (technologist) =

British technology expert

Matthew West OBE
- Born: 1953
- Died: 2023 (aged 69–70)
- Education: University of Leeds
- Employer: Shell Plc

Matthew West (1953 – 2023) was a British technology expert. He was the technical lead of the UK digital twin project. He was awarded an Order of the British Empire in recognition of his services to information management in the 2021 New Year Honours.

== Early life and education ==
West studied chemical engineering at the University of Leeds. He completed his doctoral research on numerical modelling. After graduating, he joined Shell plc, where he worked as a refinery technologist in the Shell Haven refinery. From 1987, he switched focus to concentrate on information management. He introduced computerised strategies to better understand plant performance and was made responsible for environmental issues at the refinery.

== Career ==
West worked at Shell plc for most of his career, where he became an expert in ontology. He was interested in the use of ontology to address challenges of information management in large organisation. This involved the development of the computer – business interfaces and modelling data. West contributed to data standards (ISO 15926, ISO 8000, ISO 18876) focussed on data integration and data quality. West developed the data infrastructure for Shell's globalisation initiative, "Downstream One,". Downstream One looked to gain better and more accurate data on customer interactions, eliminating errors and simplifying business processes. It reduced the number of operating systems at Shell by 90%.

West was made a visiting professor at the University of Leeds Keyworth Institute in 2001. In 2008. West took early retirement, and left Shell to make his own company, Information Junction. In 2016, he started working with the National Protective Security Authority for the Government of the United Kingdom. He was put in charge of the technical aspects of the National Digital Twin programme (NDTp), and helped the government to understand the importance of good quality information.

In 2021, West was appointed an Officer of the Order of the British Empire.

== Selected publications ==
- West, Matthew (2011). Developing high quality data models. Burlington, MA: Morgan Kaufmann. ISBN 978-0-12-375106-5.
- Computational modelling: technological futures (Report). 2018.
