= Milena Holmgren =

Chilean ecologist (born 1966)

Milena Holmgren (born 1966) is a Chilean ecologist who is a lecturer at the Wageningen University and a writer of over 60 peer-reviewed articles which were published in such journals as the Frontiers in Ecology and the Environment, Oikos, Science, and many others.

== Research ==
In September 2011 she traveled to upper Guinea where she and her group have explained the reason why 80% of species prefer rain forest there. On November 2, 2010, she discovered that in Atacama Desert only 2% of 12,150 seeds survive due to the lack of rainfall which is less than 206 millimetres (8.1 in). To her surprise, only Senna cumingii was not affected by it because they have long roots. During the same year she also studied Dicrodon guttulatum which is found only in deserts of northern Peru which feeds 78% on insects and 12% on plants. She also discovered that the juveniles of the species prefer Prosopis pallida species of plants, while females like them and other plants too.
