= Simon Lee (businessman) =

British business executive (born 1961)

- Born: Simon Philip Guy Lee; 4 March 1961 (age 65)
- Education: University of Leeds
- Occupation: Businessman
- Years active: 1982–present
- Title: former CEO, RSA Insurance Group
- Term: 2011–2013
- Successor: Stephen Hester
- Spouse: Fiona Lee
- Children: 3

Simon Philip Guy Lee (born 4 March 1961) is a British business executive. He was the chief executive (CEO) of RSA Insurance Group, a British multinational general insurance company, until 13 December 2013, when he was succeeded by Stephen Hester.

== Early life ==
Simon Lee was born on 4 March 1961. He attended Tonbridge School and the University of Leeds, where he earned a bachelor's degree in English and French.

== Career ==
Lee was chief executive of RSA Insurance Group from August 2011, and a main board director since 2007, until December 2013. He started his career with National Westminster Bank, and after 17 years rose to director of wholesale markets. Lee resigned on 13 December 2013.

He now pursues a plural career, as an advisor to Fairfax Financial, chairman of Osirium Technologies, and Hospice in the Weald. In 2018, Lee became chairman of Idefigo Ltd. He is a non-executive director of Brit Syndicates Ltd, Advent Underwriting Ltd and TIA Technology and is on the advisory boards of Afiniti and Sherpa.

== Personal life ==
He and his wife Fiona have three daughters, and live in Kent.
