= Milena Glimbovski =

German entrepreneur

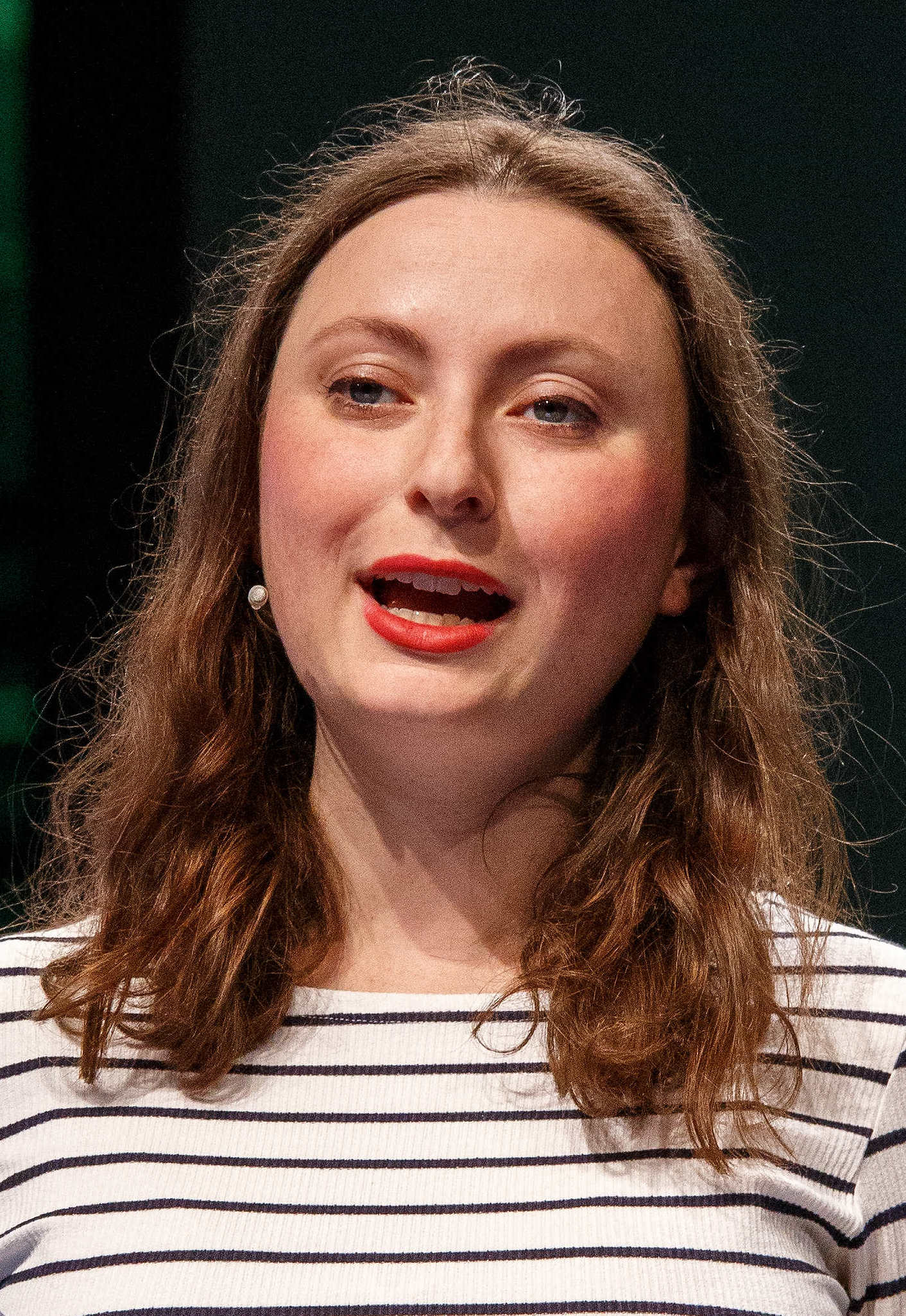
- Born: 1990 (age 35–36); Siberia, Soviet Union
- Occupations: Entrepreneur, author, zero-waste activist

Milena Glimbovski (born 1990) is a Russian-German entrepreneur, author and zero-waste activist. She is mostly known for founding of the Berlin-based "Original Unverpackt" zero-waste grocery store.

== Early life and education ==
Milena Glimbovski was born in 1990 in Siberia, in the former Soviet Union. In 1995, she moved with her family to Germany, where she grew up in Hanover and attended the Wilhelm Raabe School.

After training as a media designer, Glimbovski began studying social and business communication at the Berlin University of the Arts, but later discontinued her studies.

== Career ==
In 2014, Glimbovski launched a crowdfunding campaign with Sara Wolf to finance the launch of their zero-waste grocery store "Original Unverpackt". Their idea and crowdfunding campaign gained significant media attention and successfully raised €100,000. The shop opened on 13 September 2014 and continues to this day, although Glimbovski is no longer CEO. The opening of Original Unverpackt inspired the opening of several further zero-waste stores both in Germany and further afield. Both Glimbovski and Original Unverpackt are widely considered to have triggered the zero-waste movement in Germany.

In 2015, together with Jan Lenarz, Glimbovski founded the publishing house "Ein guter Verlag", which publishes books, planners and calendars on mindfulness and mental health.

In November 2018, a jury of the Berlin Senate, the Investitionsbank Berlin and the Berlin IHK voted Glimbovski "Entrepreneur of the Year".

Glimbovski is known as a sustainability and zero waste speaker and has appeared at numerous conferences in Germany and abroad.

== Works ==
- Ohne Wenn und Abfall. Kiepenheuer & Witsch, 2017, ISBN 978-3-462-05019-6.
- Weil ich ein Mädchen bin. In: Scarlett Curtis (Hrsg.): The Future is female! Was Frauen über Feminismus denken. Goldmann Verlag, 2018, ISBN 978-3-44215982-6, S.167–172.
- With Susanne Mierau and Katja Vogt: Einfach Familie leben. Der Minimalismus-Guide: Wohnen, Kleidung, Lifestyle, Achtsamkeit. Kneseback Verlag, April 2019, ISBN 978-3-95728-270-5.
