= Verna Wright =

Verna Wright (31 December 1928 – 31 January 1998) was a British evangelist, physician, professor of rheumatology at the University of Leeds and co-founder of United Beach Missions.

== Biography ==
Wright was educated at Bedford School and studied medicine at the University of Liverpool, then spent two years at Stoke Mandeville Hospital. As an actively practising evangelical Christian, Wright helped to found United Beach Missions, an organization whose goal was to preach the Christian gospel message to holidaymakers in Llandudno. The organization, under his leadership, grew to over 3000 people, ministering on the beaches of Britain, France and Belgium. Wright was also named as Chairman for the youth outreach organization Young Life. Throughout his ministry work, Wright focused on the "grass roots" approach, which particularly appealed to his young audience.

After gaining his MD degree from Liverpool, Wright lectured at the University of Leeds for two years before becoming a research fellow at Johns Hopkins Hospital in Baltimore. In 1964 he returned to Leeds as a Consultant Physician and Senior Lecturer, where he helped establish a specialist rheumatology unit. In 1970 he was appointed Professor of Rheumatology in the Department of Medicine at Leeds, a post he held until his retirement in 1994.

His research was characterized by a multidisciplinary approach, including engineering and pharmacology. He was partly responsible for establishing the field of rehabilitation medicine as a speciality in its own right. Wright accurately predicted genetic links between different forms of arthritis prior to the development of laboratory tests which would later prove him correct.

Wright was a Fellow of the Royal College of Physicians (FRCP) and served as chairman of the Arthritis and Rheumatism Council, was a co-director of the Bioengineering Group for the study of Human Joints and President of the Creation Science Movement in England.

While at Leeds, Wright wrote or co-authored over 1000 scientific papers and 21 books. When faced with impending death, Wright said, "When you see the tape, you run faster". On his death, a Leeds hospital hung its flag at half-mast, indicating the respect with which he was regarded.

Wright married Esther Margaret Brown in 1952. They had five sons and four daughters.

== Bibliography ==
- The Relevance of Christianity in a Scientific Age
- Personal Peace in a Nuclear Age
- "A Medical View of Miraculous Healing," chapter 11 of Peter Masters, The Healing Epidemic, London: The Wakeman Trust, 1988
