= Milena Moser =

Swiss writer (born 1963)

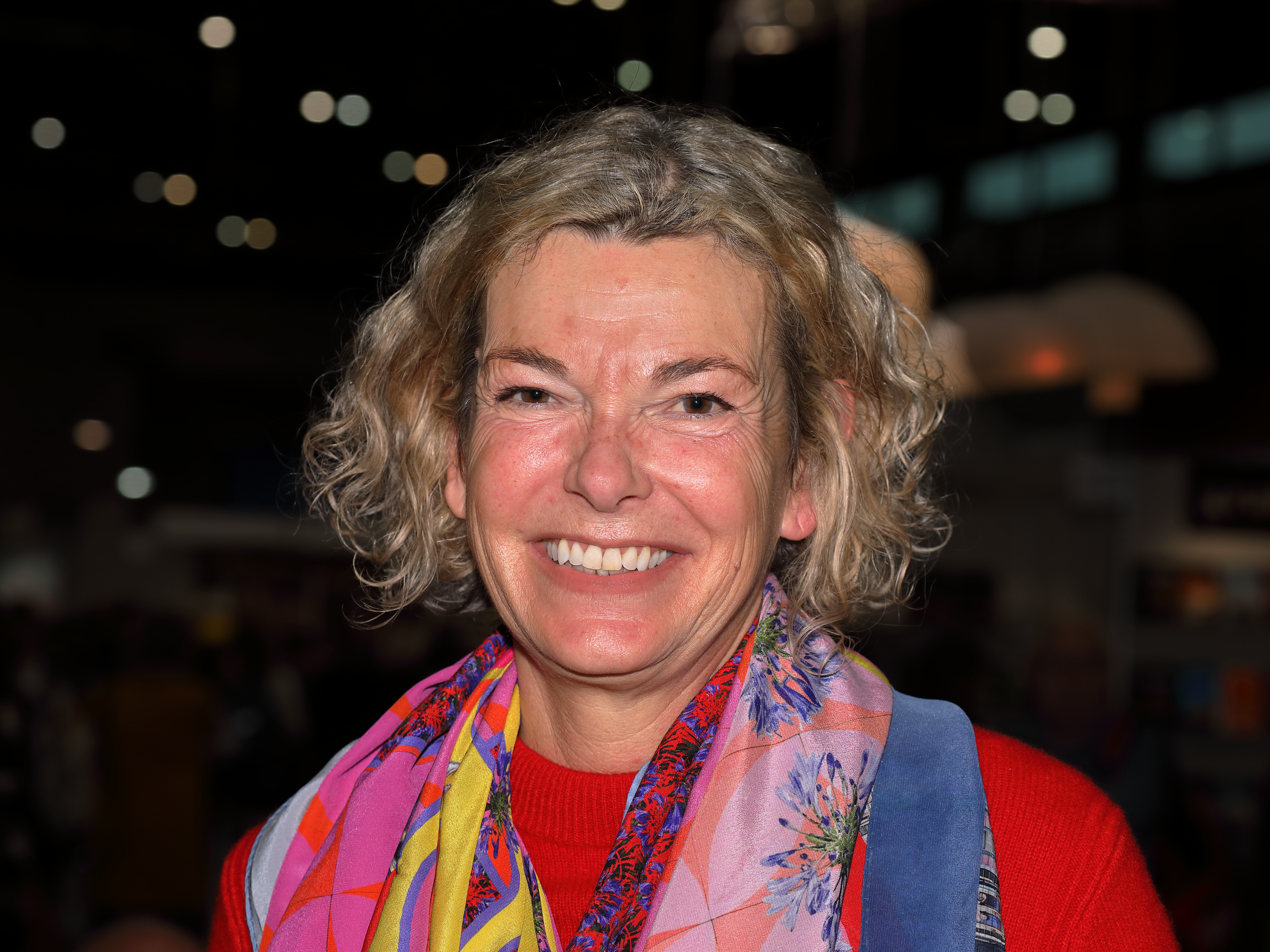
- Born: Milena Pörtner; 13 July 1963 (age 63); Zürich, Switzerland
- Occupation: Writer

Milena Moser (born Milena Pörtner on July 13, 1963) is a Swiss writer. Her first language (or dialect) is Swiss German. She has emigrated to the United States twice, in 1998 and again in 2015, but German remains the language in which she writes, and in which by 2018 more than twenty of her novels had been published.

== Biography ==
Milena Pörtner was born on July 13, 1963, in Zürich, Switzerland. Her father was the writer-playwright and dramaturge Paul Pörtner (1925-1984). Marlis Pörtner, her mother, is a psychologist who in her later years has also come to prominence as a successful author. And Milena Moser's brother, Stephan Pörtner, is an author too.

She says she knew when she was 8 that she wanted to become a writer. She attended a middle school with a non-technical focus (Diplommittelschule) and went on to complete an apprenticeship for the book trade. After that she took a writing job with the Swiss broadcasting organisation before heading for Paris where she lived for two years. By now aged 21, it was while living in Paris that she wrote her first (35 years later still unpublished) novels. In the words of one source this was the start of a period during which she "collected rejection letters for six years". (More recently she has been identified as one of Switzerland's most successful writers".)

By 1987 she was back in Zürich. With her first husband, the book trader René Moser, she set up a low volume magazine "Sans Blague, Magazin für Schund und Sünde" ("... Magazine for Trash and Sins"). With a print run of 500 per edition, this became the vehicle for the publication of her first stories. She and / or her friends also created the "Krösus Verlag" (publishing business) so that she would be able to publish her books. In 1990 "Krösus Verlag" produced the first of her published novels, "Gebrochene Herzen" ("Broken Hearts"). Since that point Milena Moser has been able to support herself from her writing.

With her next novel the memorably titled, "Die Putzfraueninsel" / "L'île des femmes de ménage", she found a wider market, with 250,000 copies sold of the German edition alone. This became the first of her novels to appear in a French translation. In 1996 the German (formerly East German) film-maker Peter Timm produced a film version.

In 1998, accompanied by her two sons and her second husband, the photographer Thomas Kern, she relocated to San Francisco. The decision to move was a spontaneous one, reached the previous year during a holiday in the States. During the eight years she spent in California she wrote three songs for the singer Michael von der Heide. "Bad Hair Days", "The postman died" and "Capuccino" later found their way onto von der Heide's album "Tourist", which appeared in 2000 and reached position 5 in the Swiss hit parade. (That makes it Michael von der Heide's most popular album to date.)

Milena Moser returned to Switzerland in 2006. She now teamed up the (formerly East German) playwright-author Sibylle Berg and with her agent Anne Wieser to set up a "writing school". In a "writing workshop" in Aarau she started providing writing courses for the untutored, also offering her services as a "writing coach" in classes producing jointly authored pieces of work. While Moser concentrated on face-to-face teaching, her business partner Sibylle Berg placed her own focus on on-line tuition courses, available to German-language students unwilling or unable to make their way to Aarau. By March 2010 it was reported that 300 students had opted for these "virtual courses".

In 2015, by now divorced from her second husband, she returned again to the United States and bought a house in Santa Fe, New Mexico, where she settled down to live alone, devoting her time exclusively to her writing.

== Published output ==
- Gebrochene Herzen oder Mein erster bis elfter Mord. Erzählungen. Krösus, Zürich 1990; Blanvalet, München 2006, ISBN 3-442-36227-X.
- Die Putzfraueninsel. Roman. Krösus, Zürich 1991; Blanvalet, München 2004, ISBN 3-442-36128-1.
- Das Schlampenbuch. Erzählungen. Krösus, Zürich 1992; Blanvalet, München 2005, ISBN 3-442-36175-3.
- Blondinenträume. Roman. Rowohlt, Reinbek 1994; als Taschenbuch ebd. 2004, ISBN 3-499-23608-7.
- Mein Vater und andere Betrüger. Roman. Rowohlt, Reinbek 1996; als Taschenbuch ebd. 1998, ISBN 3-499-22233-7.
- Das Faxenbuch. A correspondence with Angela Praesent. Rowohlt Taschenbuch, Reinbek 1996, ISBN 3-499-13928-6.
- Das Leben der Matrosen. Ein Zeitungsroman in Fortsetzungen (aus dem Tages-Anzeiger). Rowohlt Taschenbuch, Reinbek 1999, ISBN 3-499-22621-9.
- Artischockenherz. Roman. Blessing, München 1999; Goldmann, München 2001, ISBN 3-442-35520-6.
- Bananenfüße. Roman. Blessing, München 2001; Blanvalet, München 2003, ISBN 3-442-35901-5.
- Sofa, Yoga, Mord. Roman. Blessing, München 2003; Blanvalet, München 2006, ISBN 3-442-36380-2.
- Schlampen-Yoga oder Wo geht’s hier zur Erleuchtung? Blessing, München 2005, ISBN 3-89667-278-9; Heyne, München 2007, ISBN 978-3-453-60041-6.
- Stutenbiss. Roman, Blessing, München 2007, ISBN 978-3-89667-217-9; Heyne, München 2010, ISBN 978-3-453-40740-4.
- Flowers in your hair. Wie man in San Francisco glücklich wird. Blessing, München 2008, ISBN 978-3-89667-343-5; Heyne, München 2009, ISBN 978-3-453-40675-9.
- Möchtegern. Roman. Nagel & Kimche, München 2010, ISBN 978-3-312-00452-2.
- Montagsmenschen. Roman. Nagel & Kimche, München 2012, ISBN 978-3-312-00496-6
- Das wahre Leben. Roman. Nagel & Kimche, München 2013, ISBN 978-3-312-00576-5.
- Das Glück sieht immer anders aus. Nagel & Kimche, München 2015, ISBN 978-3-312-00653-3.
- Gebrauchsanweisung für Zürich. Piper, München 2015, ISBN 978-3492276597
- Hinter diesen blauen Bergen, Verlag Nagel & Kimche, 2017, ISBN 978-3312010172
- Land der Söhne, Verlag Nagel & Kimche, Zürich 2018
