= Stephen Brackstone =

English footballer (born 1982)

Personal information
- Full name: Stephen Brackstone
- Date of birth: 19 September 1982 (age 44)
- Place of birth: Hartlepool, England
- Height: 5 ft 11 in (1.80 m)
- Position: Midfielder

Youth career
- ?–2002: Middlesbrough

Senior career*
Years	Team	Apps	(Gls)
2002–2004	York City	44	(4)
2004	Bishop Auckland	6	(0)

International career
2000	England U18	2	(0)
- * Club domestic league appearances and goals

Stephen Brackstone (born 19 September 1982) is an English former footballer who played as a midfielder.

Brackstone played in the Middlesbrough youth system before joining York City in 2002. He had an operation to remove his appendix in December 2002 and he made his return to playing in March 2003. He was released by the club in 2004 and he finished his career with Bishop Auckland.

His younger brother John also became a professional footballer.

== Club career ==
Born in Hartlepool, County Durham, Brackstone played in the Middlesbrough youth system as a trainee before signing a professional contract on 7 July 2000. After being deemed surplus to requirements at Middlesbrough he signed for Third Division team York City on 27 February 2002 on a contract until the end of the 2001–02 season following a trial. He made his first team debut as an 87th minute substitute in a 2–0 victory over Darlington on 15 March. He finished the season with nine appearances and signed a new contract in May. Brackstone scored a direct free kick from 20 yards in stoppage time to give York a 2–2 draw with Bristol Rovers on 19 October. He suffered a back injury in October and after a late fitness check missed a game against Wrexham, eventually making his return in a 0–0 draw at Hartlepool United.

He had an operation to remove his appendix after being taken to hospital following his substitution against Lincoln City in December and after being expected to be out of action for six weeks he made his return in a 1–0 victory over Bournemouth on 15 March 2003. He finished the 2002–03 season with 29 appearances and two goals. He finished the 2003–04 season with 11 appearances and two goals for York and the club announced that he would be released when his contract expired on 30 June. He signed for Northern Premier League Premier Division team Bishop Auckland and made six appearances for them during the 2004–05 season.

== International career ==
Brackstone was capped twice by England at under-18 level, playing in games against France on 8 March 2000 and Luxembourg on 27 April.

== Career statistics ==
Club	Season	League^{[A]}		FA Cup		League Cup		Other^{[B]}		Total	
Club	Season	Apps	Goals	Apps	Goals	Apps	Goals	Apps	Goals	Apps	Goals
York City	2001–02	9	0	0	0	0	0	0	0	9	0
York City	2002–03	26	2	2	0	1	0	0	0	29	2
York City	2003–04	9	2	1	0	0	0	1	0	11	2
York City	Total	44	4	3	0	1	0	1	0	49	4
Bishop Auckland	2004–05	6	0	0	0	0	0	0	0	6	0
Career totals		50	4	3	0	1	0	1	0	55	4

A. The "League" column constitutes appearances and goals (including those as a substitute) in the Football League and Northern Premier League.
B. The "Other" column constitutes appearances and goals (including those as a substitute) in the Football League Trophy.
