= Dorothy Robson =

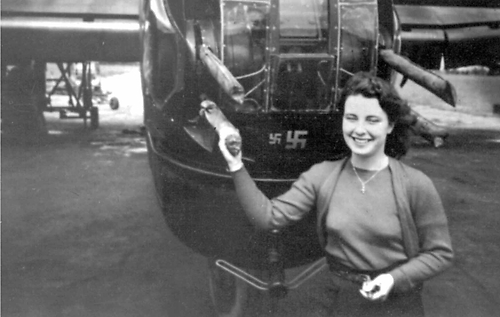
- Robson in 1942
- Born: 10 November 1919; Guisborough
- Died: 5 November 1943 (aged 23); Driffield
- Education: University of Leeds

Dorothy Robson (10 November 1919 – 5 November 1943) was an English physicist and engineer. She worked for the Ministry of Aircraft Production during World War II on the development of bombsights. Robson died after a test flight crash at age 23.

== Early life and education ==
Robson was born to father Shafto Robson, a recent World War I veteran and qualified chemist, and mother Myra Lily (née Moore) of Stockton-on-Tees, and grew up on Redcar Road in Guisborough, North Yorkshire with her older sister Norma. The two girls attended Westgate private school. In 1927, their father opened his own chemist's shop in Hartlepool, and the girls switched to Henry Smith School. Robson completed her A Levels in 1937 and was recorded in the 1939 England and Wales Register as a "Science Student at University". She went on to graduate with a Bachelor of Science (BSc) in Physics with Electrical Engineering from the University of Leeds in 1940.

== Career ==
After graduating, Robson applied to join the Royal Air Force (RAF) but was rejected for being too short. In 1942, she secured a secretive job at the Ministry of Aircraft Production in Farnborough, where she helped develop bombsights for more accurate precision targeting. As a technician and junior scientific officer, Robson travelled around aerodromes and became primarily based in the Northern Bomber Command, where she earned the affectionate nicknames "Bombsight Bertha" and the "girl with the laughing eyes". According to an October 1943 Yorkshire Evening Post article, Robson was "one of two women touring the country to test and adjust bomb-sight aerodromes" alongside F. Rutter.

A week before her 24th birthday, Robson was fitting and testing a new No. 76 Squadron Handley Page Halifax at RAF Holme-on-Spalding Moor. With six other crew members and piloted by James Steele, it was decided the aircraft would undergo a 30-minute test flight, with Robson taking navigator Frederick Hall's place checking the bombsight in the nose. The plane crashed in the moorland at Enthorpe 3 miles northeast of Market Weighton. Hall claimed the crash was unexpected and for "reasons unknown". Steele had apparently attempted to fly the plane at a low level to maintain sight of the ground features, ducking under a cloud before crashing into higher ground obscured by fog. Three of the crew members were killed instantly, while Robson was fatally injured. She died in The Emergency Hospital, Great Driffield, two days later and, per request, had her ashes scattered from the air.

Robson's death was widely mourned within the RAF Command. A large congregation gathered at St Hilda's Church, Hartlepool to commemorate Robson on 8 November 1943.

== Legacy ==
A memorial to Robson was proposed shortly after her death.

In 1993, two stained-glass windows in All Saints' Church, Holme-on-Spalding-Moor were dedicated to 76 Squadron, with Robson's name appearing in the remembrance book. With the support of local people, in 2001, a permanent plaque listing Robson was placed on Hartlepool's war memorial. Robson has a special mention on a 76 Squadron memorial in Malton.

Historian Peter D Mason covered Robinson in his book Wings over Linton: The History of RAF Linton-on-Ouse (1994). He met with Robson's sister and family.

In 2025, Robson was one of ten women "who played vital roles during World War II" to receive a silhouette statue created by Standing with Giants for the Women of War exhibition at Lincoln's International Bomber Command Centre.
