= Harold Orton =

British dialectologist and professor

- Born: 23 October 1898; Byers Green, County Durham, England
- Died: 7 March 1975 (aged 76); Leeds, England
- Occupation(s): Professor of English language and dialectologist

Harold Orton (23 October 1898 – 7 March 1975) was a British dialectologist and professor of English language and Medieval Literature at the University of Leeds.

== Early life ==
Orton was born in Byers Green, County Durham, on 23 October 1898 and was educated at King James I Grammar School, in Bishop Auckland, and at the University of Durham. He left university in 1917 to enrol in the Durham Light Infantry in which he was commissioned as a lieutenant. He was wounded severely in 1918, never regaining full use of his right arm, and was invalided out of the army in 1919. He insisted to army surgeons that his arm not be amputated.

== Academic career ==
After leaving the army, in 1918 Orton went to Merton College, Oxford, where he studied under Henry Cecil Kennedy Wyld and Joseph Wright, author of the English Dialect Dictionary (McDavid, 1976). His thesis from Oxford, on the dialect of his native Byers Green, was later published as a book.

He then spent several years on the staff of Uppsala University in Sweden until 1928, when he was appointed to a lectureship at King's College, Newcastle (now the University of Newcastle). Between 1928 and 1939, he surveyed the dialects of 35 sites in Northumberland and north Durham, which became known as the Orton Corpus. It was not published until 1998, when it was edited by Kurt Rydland.

Orton became head of the Department of English Language at the University of Sheffield in 1939 but secondment to the British Council interrupted that work until the end of World War II.

In 1946, he was appointed professor of English Language and Medieval Literature at the University of Leeds, succeeding Bruce Dickins, where he taught until his retirement as emeritus professor in 1964.

Orton was a visiting professor at the Universities of Kansas (1965, 1967, 1968), Iowa (1966) and Tennessee (1970, 1972, 1973) and at Belmont University, Nashville (1971). In contrast to the flexible questionnaire of the Dictionary of American Regional English, Orton worked with Nathalia Wright on a fixed questionnaire for all American dialects, but this was not successful.

Orton is best remembered as co-founder of the Survey of English Dialects (SED). He developed the questionnaire for the survey together with Eugen Dieth. He lived to see the publication of the Basic Material from the SED, but died before the publications of The Word Geography of England and The Linguistic Atlas of England. His pupil David Parry went on to apply the same principles used for the SED to Welsh English, founding the Survey of Anglo-Welsh Dialects (SAWD) at Swansea University in 1968.

Many who met Orton said that he had a driving passion for his subject. In the early part of his career, he was nicknamed "the phonetic fanatic". During the Survey of English Dialects, he worked even on Christmas Day.

== Death and legacy ==
Orton died in Leeds on 7 March 1975 following a stroke.

An overview of Orton's career was published by Craig Fees in 1991 as the first part in a series on dialect and folk studies. In the same year, Fees wrote a strongly-worded defence of Orton against those who had criticised his work.

== Selected bibliography ==
- Orton, Harold (1930). The Phonology of a South Durham Dialect, London.
- Orton, Harold (1971). Editorial Problems of an English Dialect Atlas. In: Burghardt, Lorraine H. (ed.): Dialectology: Problems and Perspectives. Knoxville: Univ. of Tennessee, 79–115.
- Orton, Harold and Eugen Dieth (1952), A Questionnaire for a Linguistic Atlas of England. Leeds: Leeds Philosophical and Literary Society.
- Orton, Harold and Nathalia Wright (1972). Questionnaire for the Investigation of American Regional English. Knoxville: University of Tennessee.
- Orton, Harold and Nathalia Wright (1975). A Word Geography of England. New York: Seminar Press.
- Orton, Harold et al. (1962–71). Survey of English Dialects: Basic Materials. Introduction and 4 vols. (each in 3 parts). Leeds: E. J. Arnold & Son.
