= English Today =

- Discipline: English language
- Language: English
- Edited by: Clive Upton

Publication details
- History: 1985-present
- Publisher: Cambridge University Press
- Frequency: Quarterly

Standard abbreviations
- ISO 4: Engl. Today

Indexing
- ISSN: 0266-0784 (print); 1474-0567 (web)
- OCLC no.: 11908022

Links
- Journal homepage

English Today is an academic journal on the English language, established in 1985 by Tom McArthur (who edited it until 2008) and published quarterly by Cambridge University Press. Its scope covers all aspects of current English and its varieties used around the world. The current editor-in-chief is Emeritus Professor Clive Upton (University of Leeds).

== Abstracting and indexing ==
The journal is abstracted and indexed in the MLA Bibliography.
