= Michael Martin (engineer) =

British bridge engineer

- Education: Carlisle Technical College, University of Leeds
- Engineering career
- Discipline: Civil
- Projects: Kessock Bridge, Kylesku Bridge, Dornoch Firth Bridge, Queensferry Crossing
- Awards: Officer of the Order of the British Empire

Michael Martin OBE is a British bridge engineer. He grew up in Carlisle and studied at the Carlisle Technical College before achieving a degree in civil engineering from the University of Leeds. Martin began his career as a design engineer at Ove Arup & Partners and served as their representative during the construction of the Kessock Bridge. He thereafter joined the contractor Morrison Construction and was their chief engineer for the construction of the Dornoch Firth and Kylesku Bridges. Under Martin's direction the company won some of the first Private Finance Initiative infrastructure contracts in the UK. He transferred to Anglian Water after that company purchased Morrison in 2000 and became their head of health and safety. After a brief early retirement he returned as a consultant for WS Atkins and to lead a £2.2 billion water infrastructure partnership programme. He returned from retirement for a second time to act as Galliford Try (who had purchased Morrison Construction in 2005) representative on the board of the company constructing the £1.4 billion Queensferry Crossing. In 2014 he was appointed project director for all companies in the contracting joint venture and oversaw the project's completion in 2017.

== Early life ==
Martin grew up in Denton Holme, Carlisle, the son of Julie Martin, a lecturer at Carlisle Technical College. As a child he would play on the Holme Head Bridge across the River Caldew and was once, at the age of three, taken home to his parents by a stranger who found him scrambling along the outside of the bridge. A family friend later showed Martin his back issues of the New Civil Engineer magazine and, attracted by what appeared to him as "marvellous salaries of up to £3,000 a year" and opportunities to work overseas, Martin became determined to become a civil engineer.

Martin failed his eleven-plus exams for grammar school entry and attended Robert Ferguson School. He subsequently studied at Carlisle Technical College where he first met his future-wife, Mary McFeeters, whilst suffering from a footballing injury in which he sustained facial damage and lost two teeth. Martin passed five A-levels which enabled him to study a civil engineering degree at the University of Leeds.

== Bridge engineer ==
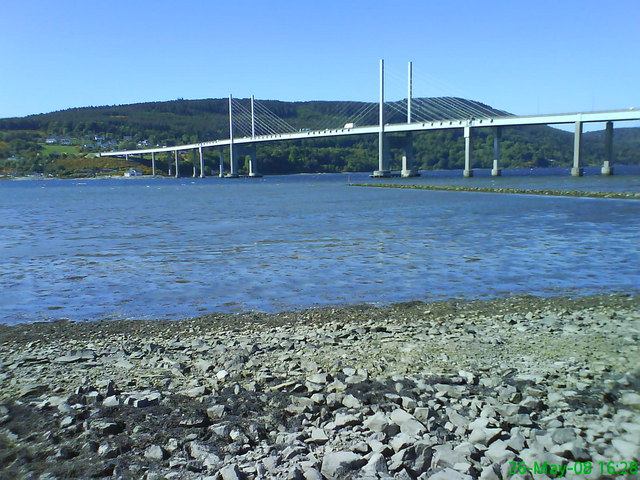
Kessock Bridge in 2008

Martin graduated with a Bachelor of Science degree in 1975 and began working for Ove Arup & Partners. He spent the first three years working out of an office in London on projects including the design of Brighton Marina. A keen outdoorsman, city life did not agree with him and Martin contemplated emigrating to Canada. This ambition was thwarted when he approached the Canadian Embassy one Saturday but found that it was closed. One of his colleagues suggested that he instead apply for a position as the client representative during construction of the Kessock Bridge, Inverness in the Scottish Highlands.

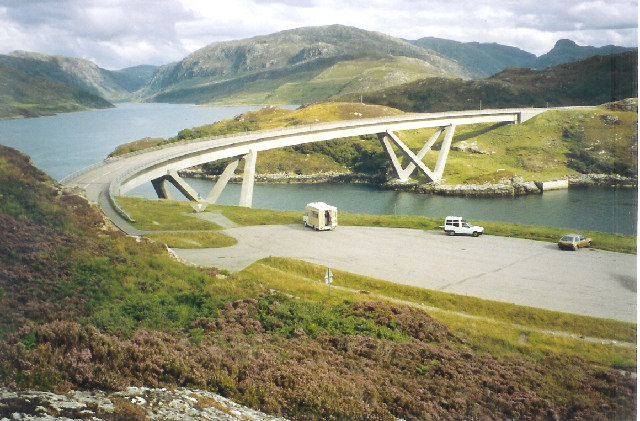
Kylesku Bridge not long after completion

Martin left Arup after the Kessock Bridge was completed in 1980 and joined Scottish infrastructure firm Morrison Construction. Martin had intended to return to Arup after gaining a couple of years' experience with a contractor but would remain with Morrison for much of the rest of his career. His initial role was to estimate the costs of temporary works required during construction. In 1984 he was appointed chief engineer for the construction of the Kylesku Bridge in Sutherland, which had been designed by his former colleagues at Ove Arup. There was a great level of detail required on this project as the structure was curved and Martin drew more than 250 drawings to explain technical aspects of the design to site personnel. Martin later described the lifting into place of the central 25m span of the bridge, witnessed by hundreds of people and several television crews, as the most nerve-wracking experience of his life – made more so by the unexpected tooting of a tug's horn as a celebration. The project was not commercially successful but made Martin's reputation as a leading bridge engineer.

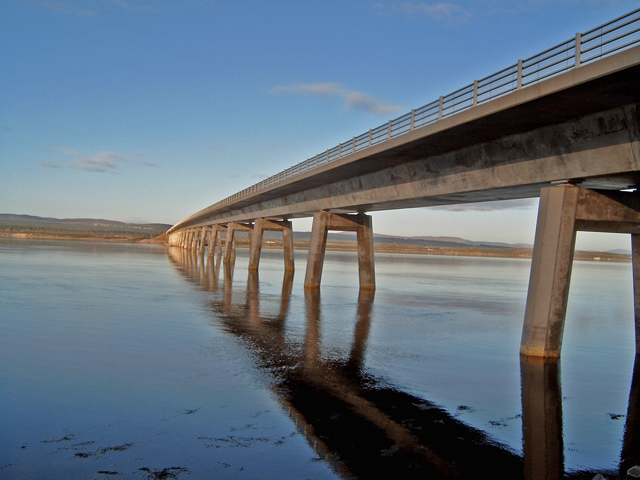
Dornoch Firth Bridge

Between 1988 and 1991 Martin served as chief engineer during the design and construction of the half-mile long Dornoch Firth Bridge. He later headed Morrison's team working on a bid for the proposed Skye Bridge. Martin opted for a more conservative design which eventually lost the bid to a cheaper, more complex proposal which would later encounter technical difficulties in construction. Martin successfully won bids for the construction and maintenance of the A69 Haltwhistle Bypass, the first Private Finance Initiative (PFI) highways project in the country; a £250mn contract for Edinburgh Royal Infirmary and the first ever PFI contracts for Scottish Water and the Ministry of Defence.

== Director ==
After the 1991 purchase of Shand Civil Engineering by Morrison Construction, Martin was appointed director of the newly acquired international business. He was responsible for carrying out works in Dubai, Ghana, South Africa and the former USSR particularly in the petrochemical field. Whilst in Russia on business he was in Red Square just weeks after it had been the scene of the failed coup of 1993. Under Martin's direction Morrison won a five-year tender for works for the Falklands Islands Government to assist in recovery from the 1982 war. This win contradicted his previous position of maintaining a tighter focus on international bids but led to a long-term relationship with the Falklands Islands and the British Antarctic Survey which continues to this day.

Martin was appointed head of Morrison's infrastructure division and after the company's floatation on the London Stock Exchange in 1996 was appointed to its main board. The company was purchased by Anglian Water in 2000 and Martin was appointed to their board, soon becoming the only former-Morrison director to sit there. Martin led Anglian Water's engineering and programme management business before being appointed head of its Morrison Construction division and later the facilities management division. The latter two divisions were divested by Anglian Water in 2005 to Galliford Try and Martin remained at Anglian Water as their head of health and safety, being responsible for introducing a new group-wide health and safety scheme. Martin took early retirement at the age of 52 to spend more time on his hobbies of salmon fishing and golf.

Shortly after retirement Martin returned to work as a consultant for engineering consultancy WS Atkins. Six months into retirement he was approached to become chief operating officer of Scottish Water Solutions, a partnership of Scottish Water and several private companies responsible for delivering 2,500 water infrastructure projects totaling £2.2 billion. After completion of their programme of works Martin retired for the second time.

== Queensferry Crossing ==
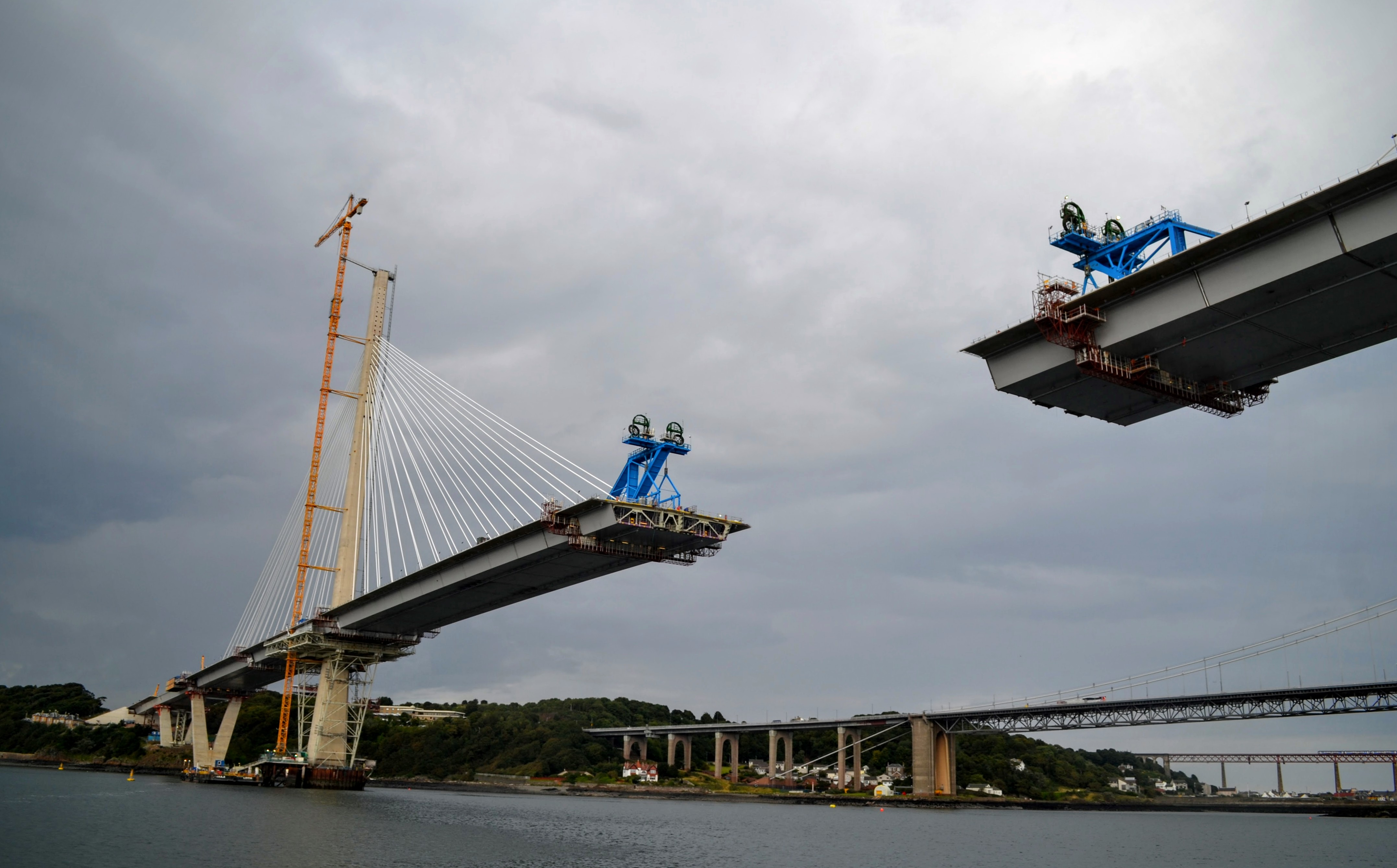
Queensferry Crossing under construction, 2016

Martin returned from retirement for a second time at the request of former colleagues at Galliford Try in 2012. He was asked to represent the company on the board of the Forth Crossing Bridge Constructors (FCBC) joint venture (Galliford Try were working in conjunction with American Bridge, Hochtief and Dragados) working to construct the £1.4 billion Queensferry Crossing. Two years later the FCBC project director (Hochtief's Carlo Germani) resigned to work in Qatar and Martin was asked to become his replacement. The bridge construction involved more than 15,000 workers, of whom up to 1,500 were on site at any one time. The crossing is the largest three-tower cable-stayed bridge in the world and opened in August 2017. Martin was appointed an Officer of the Order of the British Empire in the 2018 Queen's Birthday Honours in recognition of his role in the bridge's construction.

== Personal life ==
Martin has two sons and two grandchildren.
