= Survey of English Dialects =

Dialect survey of England and Wales

A map displaying the localities included in the Survey of English Dialects

The Survey of English Dialects was undertaken between 1950 and 1961 under the direction of Harold Orton of the English department of the University of Leeds. It aimed to collect the full range of speech in England and Wales before local differences were to disappear. Standardisation of the English language was expected with the post-war increase in social mobility and the spread of the mass media. The project originated in discussions between Orton and Eugen Dieth of the University of Zurich about the desirability of producing a linguistic atlas of England in 1946, and a questionnaire containing 1,300 questions was devised between 1947 and 1952.

== Methodology ==
313 localities were selected from England, the Isle of Man and some areas of Wales close to the English border. Priority was given to rural areas with a history of a stable population. When selecting speakers, priority was given to men, to the elderly and to those who worked in the main industry of the area, for these were all seen as traits that were connected to use of local dialect. One field worker gathering material claimed they had to dress in old clothes to gain the confidence of elderly villagers. Typically between three and six informants were interviewed at each site. At a few sites, only one or two suitable informants were found and interviewed.

The Survey was one of the first to make tape recordings of informants. However, the early tape recordings were of such poor quality that they were unusable. Many of the sites visited had not yet been electrified, which made recording difficult. In the Isle of Man, the fieldworker Michael Barry risked electrocuting himself by plugging a recorder into a light socket for the sake of a recording of the local dialect. Only 287 of the 313 sites had a recording made, and the recording is not always of the same informants that answered the questionnaire. Most of the recordings are of inhabitants discussing their local industry, but one of the recordings, that at Skelmanthorpe in West Yorkshire, discussed a sighting of a ghost. Extracts from these recordings are now all freely available online through the British Library, together with some transcriptions in X-SAMPA substitutions of the international phonetic alphabet.

The ethnographer Werner Kissling took some photographs in some areas (e.g. Wensleydale) as part of the Survey.

Most of the sites were small villages. The literature usually refers to the "four urban sites" of Hackney, Leeds, Sheffield and York, where large parts of the questionnaire were not asked as the residents were unlikely to be familiar with the agricultural subject matter. The large town (now a city) of Newport, then in Monmouthshire, was included late in the survey. There were also some towns (e.g. Fleetwood, Washington) and suburbs (e.g. Harwood in Bolton, Wibsey in Bradford) where, although the full questionnaire was administered, some of the questions focused on agriculture found no answer. It was originally planned to survey urban areas at a later date, but this was plan was abandoned owing to a lack of financial resources. In the Introduction volume, Harold Orton wrote, "For our investigation of the town dialects we contemplate the use of a 'short' questionnaire, which will omit the books relating to husbandry, but on the other hand will include more notions relating to the life of the artisan and the syntactical aspects of his speech." One of the main fieldworkers, Stanley Ellis, later wrote, "The problems of the investigation of town dialects … are so complex as to be insoluble, in the opinion of this reviewer".

The original book Survey of English Dialects: Introduction (1962) listed only 311 sites, excluding Newport and the village of Lyonshall in Herefordshire, close to the Welsh border. The introduction to the Basic Material for the West Midlands stated that these two sites had been added after the initial selection of the other sites, and there had been concerns about including Newport's responses in the Survey, as the respondent had only been able to answer two of the nine questionnaire books, but it was eventually included on the basis that other urban sites were also missing answers to some books. However, the original 311 figure was repeated without correction in the list of localities at the start of the final Linguistic Atlas of England (1975), even though the sites were plotted on maps as Mon7 for Newport and He7 for Lyonshall. The figure of 311 has been reproduced many times since in textbooks such as English Around the World (1997, p. 160) and Methods and Data in English Historical Dialectology (2004, p. 142), but the correct number of sites is 313.

== Publication of material ==
404,000 items of information were gathered, and these were published as thirteen volumes of "basic material" beginning in 1962. The process took many years, and was prone to funding difficulties on more than one occasion.

In 1966, Eduard Kolb published Linguistic atlas of England: Phonological atlas of the northern region; the six northern counties, North Lincolnshire and the Isle of Man, which mapped variation in the most linguistically diverse part of England. This book is out of print and very rare.

The basic material had been written using specialised phonetic shorthand unintelligible to the general reader: in 1974 a more accessible book, A Word Geography of England was published. Harold Orton died soon after this in March 1975.

The Linguistic Atlas of England was published in 1978, edited by Orton, Stewart Sanderson and John Widdowson. Four further publications have been produced from the Survey's material, Word Maps (1987 [2015]) co-authored by Clive Upton, Sanderson and Widdowson, A Structural Atlas of the English Dialects by Peter M. Anderson, Survey of English Dialect: The Dictionary and Grammar (1994) co-authored by Upton, David Parry and Widdowson, and An Atlas of English Dialects (1996), co-authored by Upton and Widdowson.

It was originally planned to published four "Companion Volumes" of selected incidental material, to correspond with the four volumes of the basic material. These were designed to investigate the development of the chief Middle English sounds, and of certain morphological features and syntactical usages, in each locality.

As late as 1987, Croom Helm published A Structural Atlas of the English Dialects by Peter M. Anderson, which mapped the development of Middle English vowels, as well as of rhoticity and of a few consonants.

== Archive material ==
A large amount of "incidental material" from the survey was not published. This is preserved in the Leeds Archive of Vernacular Culture in the Special Collections of the Brotherton Library at the University of Leeds.

== Sites for the survey ==
During the survey, each locality was given an identifying abbreviation, which is given in brackets.

=== Wales ===
Flintshire

- Hanmer (Ch6)

Monmouthshire

- Llanellen (Mon2)
- Llanfrechfa (Mon5)
- Newport (Mon7)
- Raglan (Mon3)
- Crosskeys (Mon4)
- Shirenewton (Mon6)
- Skenfrith (Mon1)

=== Isle of Man ===
- Andreas (Man1)
- Ronague (Man2)

=== England ===
Bedfordshire

- Great Barford (Bd2)
- Harlington (Bd3)
- Turvey (Bd1)

Berkshire

- Buckland (Brk1)
- Inkpen (Brk4)
- Swallowfield (Brk5)
- Uffington (Brk2)
- West Ilsley (Brk3)

Buckinghamshire

- Buckland (Bk4)
- Coleshill (Bk5)
- Horton (Bk6)
- Long Crendon (Bk3)
- Stewkley (Bk2)
- Tingewick (Bk1)

Cambridgeshire

- Little Downham (C1)
- Elsworth (C2)

Cheshire

- Audlem (Ch5)
- Farndon (Ch4)
- Kingsley (Ch1)
- Rainow (Ch2)
- Swettenham (Ch3)

Cornwall

- Altarnun (Co2)
- Egloshayle (Co3)
- Gwinear (Co5)
- Kilkhampton (Co1)
- Mullion (Co7)
- St Buryan (Co6)
- St Ewe (Co4)

Cumberland

- Abbeytown (Cu2)
- Brigham (Cu3)
- Gosforth (Cu6)
- Hunsonby (Cu5)
- Longtown (Cu1)
- Threlkeld (Cu4)

Derbyshire

- Bamford (Db2)
- Burbage (Db3)
- Charlesworth (near Glossop, Db1)
- Kniveton (near Ashbourne, Db6)
- Stonebroom (Db5)
- Sutton on the Hill (west of Derby, Db7)
- Youlgreave (Db4)

Devon

- Blackawton (D11)
- Chawleigh (D4)
- Cornwood (D10)
- Gittisham (D5)
- Kennford (D7)
- Parracombe (D1)
- Peter Tavy (D8)
- South Zeal (D6)
- Swimbridge (D2)
- Weare Giffard (D3)
- Widecombe-in-the-Moor (D9)

Dorset

- Ansty, Dorset (Do2)
- Kingston (Do5)
- Portesham (Do4)
- Sixpenny Handley (Do1)
- Whitchurch Canonicorum (Do3)

Durham

- Bishop Middleham (Du5)
- Ebchester (Du2)
- Eggleston (Du6)
- Washington (Du1)
- Wearhead (Du3)
- Witton-le-Wear (Du4)

Essex

- Belchamp Walter (Ess2)
- Canewdon (Ess15)
- Cornish Hall End (Ess3)
- Doddinghurst (Ess14)
- East Mersea (Ess10)
- Great Chesterford (Ess1)
- Henham (Ess4)
- High Easter (Ess8)
- Little Baddow (Ess12)
- Tiptree (Ess9)
- Tillingham (Ess13)
- Little Bentley (Ess7)
- Netteswell (Ess11)
- Stisted (Ess5)
- West Bergholt (Ess6)

Gloucestershire

- Bream (Gl3)
- Deerhurst (Gl1)
- Gretton (Gl2)
- Latteridge (Gl7)
- Sherborne (Gl5)
- Slimbridge (Gl6)
- Whiteshill (Gl4)

Hampshire

- Burley (Ha6)
- Hambledon (Ha5)
- Hatherden (Ha1)
- King's Somborne (Ha3)
- New Alresford (Ha4)
- Oakley (Ha2)

Herefordshire

- Brimfield (He1)
- Checkley (He4)
- Cradley (He3)
- Longtown (He5)
- Lyonshall (He7)
- Weobley (He2)
- Whitchurch (He6)

Hertfordshire

- Codicote (Hrt2)
- Therfield (Hrt1)
- Wheathampstead (Hrt3)

Huntingdonshire

- Warboys (Hu1)
- Kimbolton (Hu2)

Isle of Wight

- Whitwell (Ha7)

Kent

- Appledore, Kent (K7)
- Denton (K5)
- Farningham (K2)
- Goudhurst (K6)
- Staple (K3)
- Stoke (K1)
- Warren Street (K4)

Lancashire

- Bickerstaffe (La13)
- Cartmel (La2)
- Coniston (La1)
- Dolphinholme (La4)
- Eccleston (La11)
- Fleetwood (La5)
- Halewood (Liverpool, La14)
- Harwood (La12)
- Marshside (La10)
- Pilling (La6)
- Read (La9)
- Ribchester (La8)
- Thistleton (La7)
- Yealand (La3)

Leicestershire

- Carlton Curlieu (Lei9)
- Goadby (Lei8)
- Great Dalby (Lei6)
- Harby (Lei1)
- Hathern (Lei2)
- Markfield (Lei5)
- Packington (Lei4)
- Seagrave (Lei3)
- Sheepy Magna (Lei7)
- Ullesthorpe (Lei10)

Lincolnshire

- Beckingham (L10)
- Crowland (L15)
- Eastoft (L1)
- Fulbeck (L11)
- Keelby (L3)
- Lutton (L14)
- Old Bolingbroke (L8)
- Saxby All Saints (L2)
- Scopwick (L9)
- Sutterton (L12)
- Swaby (L7)
- Swinstead (L13)
- Tealby (L5)
- Willoughton (L4)
- Wragby (L6)

Middlesex

- Hackney (MxL2)
- Harmondsworth (MxL1)

Norfolk

- Ashwellthorpe (Nf10)
- Blickling (Nf3)
- Docking (Nf1)
- Garboldisham (Nf13)
- Gooderstone (Nf8)
- Great Snoring (Nf2)
- Grimston (NF4)
- Ludham (Nf6)
- North Elmham (Nf5)
- Outwell (Nf7)
- Pulham St Mary (Nf12)
- Reedham (Nf11)
- Shipdham (Nf9)

Northamptonshire

- Kislingbury (Nth4)
- Little Harrowden (Nth3)
- Sulgrave (Nth5)
- Warmington (Nth1)
- Welford (Nth2)

Northumberland

- Allendale (Nb9)
- Earsdon (Nb6)
- Ellington (Nb4)
- Embleton (Nb2)
- Haltwhistle (Nb7)
- Heddon-on-the-Wall (Nb8)
- Lowick (Nb1)
- Thropton (Nb3)
- Wark on Tyne (Nb5)

Nottinghamshire

- Cuckney (Nt2)
- North Wheatley (Nt1)
- Oxton (Nt4)
- South Clifton (Nt3)

Oxfordshire

- Binfield Heath (O6)
- Cuxham (O5)
- Eynsham (O4)
- Islip (O3)
- Kingham (O1)
- Steeple Aston (O2)

Rutland

- Empingham (R1)
- Lyddington (R2)

Shropshire

- All Stretton (Sa7)
- Chirbury (Sa6)
- Clun (Sa9)
- Diddlebury (Sa10)
- Hilton (Sa8)
- Kinlet (Sa11)
- Kynnersley (Sa5)
- Llanymynech (Sa3)
- Montford (Sa4)
- Prees (Sa2)
- Weston Rhyn (Sa1)

Somerset

- Blagdon (So1)
- Brompton Regis (So9)
- Coleford (So4)
- Horsington (So11)
- Merriott (So13)
- Pitminster (So12)
- Stogumber (So7)
- Stogursey (So6)
- Stoke St Gregory (So10)
- Wedmore (So3)
- Weston (So1)
- Withypool (So8)
- Wootton Courtenay (So5)

Staffordshire

- Alton (St3)
- Barlaston (St4)
- Edingale (St9)
- Ellenhall (St5)
- Himley (St11)
- Hoar Cross (St6)
- Lapley (St8)
- Mavesyn Ridware (St7)
- Mow Cop (St2)
- Warslow (St1)
- Wigginton (St10)

Suffolk

- Kedington (Sf4)
- Kersey (Sf5)
- Mendlesham (Sf2)
- Tuddenham (Sf1)
- Yoxford (Sf3)

Surrey

- Coldharbour (Sr3)
- East Clandon (Sr2)
- Outwood (Sr4)
- Thursley (Sr5)
- Walton-on-the-Hill (Sr1)

Sussex

- East Harting (Sx2)
- Firle (Sx6)
- Fletching (Sx4)
- Horam (Sx5)
- Sutton (Sx3)
- Warnham (Sx1)

Warwickshire

- Aston Cantlow (Wa5)
- Hockley Heath (Wa2)
- Lighthorne (Wa6)
- Napton on the Hill (Wa4)
- Nether Whitacre (Wa1)
- Shipston-on-Stour (Wa7)
- Stoneleigh (Wa3)

Westmorland

- Great Strickland (We1)
- Patterdale (We2)
- Soulby (We3)
- Staveley-in-Kendal (We4)

Wiltshire

- Ashton Keynes (W1)
- Avebury (W3)
- Burbage (W4)
- Fovant (W8)
- Netheravon (W6)
- Steeple Ashton (W5)
- Sutton Benger (W2)
- Sutton Veny (W7)
- Whiteparish (W9)

Worcestershire

- Bretforton (Wo7)
- Clifton upon Teme (Wo4)
- Earl's Croome (Wo5)
- Hanbury (Wo3)
- Hartlebury (Wo2)
- Offenham (Wo6)
- Romsley (Wo1)

Yorkshire

City of York

- York (Y19)

East Riding

- Nafferton (Y20)
- Newbald (Y25)
- Rillington (near Norton-on-Derwent) (Y11)
- Welwick (Y28)

North Riding

- Askrigg (Y7)
- Bedale (Y8)
- Borrowby (Y9)
- Easingwold (Y16)
- Egton (Y4)
- Helmsley (Y10)
- Melsonby (Y1)
- Muker (Y6)
- Skelton (Y3)
- Stokesley (Y2)

West Riding

- Burton-in-Lonsdale (Y12)
- Carleton (Y27)
- Cawood (Y24)
- Dent (Y5)
- Ecclesfield (Y32)
- Gargrave (Y17)
- Golcar (Y29)
- Grassington (Y14)
- Heptonstall (Y21)
- Holmbridge (near Holmfirth, Y30)
- Horton in Ribblesdale (Y13)
- Leeds (Y23)
- Pateley Bridge (Y15)
- Skelmanthorpe (Y31)
- Sheffield (Y34)
- Spofforth (Y18)
- Thornhill (Y26)
- Tickhill (Y33)
- Wibsey (Y22)

== Criticisms ==
The output of the Survey was criticised by some linguists as outdated. In a review of The Linguistic Atlas of England John C Wells wrote, "the phonetic approach of the survey's scholars is pure nineteenth century: it takes no account of structuralist phonemics, let alone more recent developments in phonological theory." He suggested that the survey should have been The Linguistic Atlas of Working-class Rural England, and said that many well-known features of contemporary urban accents were not recorded in the Atlas. Similar criticisms of the sample were made by sociolinguists such as Peter Trudgill and Jack Chambers. However, Sarah Elizabeth Haigh has said that this "seems to rather miss the point of the survey", which was to record dialects before they died out and was not to represent contemporary speech. Wells's final comment in one version of his review that, when comparing with linguistic atlases from America and Scotland, he felt "ashamed for [his] country" earned a rebuke from the Welsh linguist Robert Penhallurick.

KM Petyt has highlighted the problem of using several fieldworkers in the same survey and suggested that some of the isoglosses are really "iso-fieldworkers". He gives the subtle distinction between the sounds ɔ and ɒ as an example of inconsistent recording in the survey, where some fieldworkers tended to write ɔ and others tended to write ɒ. Mark J. Jones has noted that the transcriptions for the SED do not always match the tape recordings made, most notably in the under-reporting of glottal stops. He wrote, "This is an unsurprising and expected consequence of impressionistic transcription, particularly when running speech is being transcribed, and in no way detracts from the feat achieved by the SED fieldworkers."

The Survey of English Dialects has also been criticised by more traditional dialectologists. In the book A Grammar of the Dialect of the Bolton Area, Graham Shorrocks said that the contribution of the SED to syntax was "disappointing" with many regional forms missed by the questionnaire and the information recorded being done inconsistently by fieldworkers. On the questionnaire used in the Survey, Shorrocks said that this had the advantage of facilitating comparisons in how the same term was pronounced in different locations, but that this missed intricacies of particular dialects such as the use of multiple terms for the same thing, and the use of syntax and suprasegmentals in natural speech.

=== Counter-criticism ===
The German linguist Wolfgang Viereck has argued that critics of the SED often make "superficial" criticisms whilst simultaneously using the SED data extensively for their own work. He has criticised the claims of sociolinguists to have superior methods to the SED and challenged sociolinguists to undertake a new nationwide survey to vindicate their methods as superior. He has written:

The criticism that the Survey of English Dialects (SED) has received has not always been constructive and fair. One should not forget the magnitude of the task and the difficult post-war years when the SED fieldwork was begun. One should also not criticise the SED for not being able to answer questions that it never set out to answer. Some modern sociolinguists tend to do this, but even they cannot afford to neglect its data.

In A Structural Atlas of the English Dialects, Peter M. Anderson made several of the same points and also argued that the phonetic realities from the Survey were "rarely in doubt".

In an article named The Historiography of Dialectology, Craig Frees defended the SED against a series of criticisms. Frees argues that many of the criticisms ignore the role of the SED within a broader programme of dialect research at the University of Leeds, which included more than 100 separate dialect monographs, and the history of funding difficulties, which led to the abandonment of the plan to investigate urban dialects at a later date. Frees wrote of the SED's co-founder, Harold Orton: "despite everything he did for British dialectology and English cultural studies, there is still no dedicated biography or in-depth critical analysis of his career, and his work is trivialised through misrepresentation, the unchecked repetition of mistakes, and what appears to be a superficial and historically ungrounded critique."

== Subsequent work ==
The SED was a strong influence of the Survey of Anglo-Welsh Dialects and the uncompleted Survey of Hiberno-English Speech. Although comparisons are often made between the SED and the Linguistic Survey of Scotland, there was no link between the two.

The SED fieldworker Peter Wright, a native of the seaside town of Fleetwood, developed a questionnaire for a proposed follow-up survey of coastal communities in England, on the basis that these communities had different ways of speaking from inland areas and had been largely missed by the survey. A full survey was never undertaken, but the questionnaire was used in some sites, such as in a 1980 study of the dialect of Holy Island.

Sixty-six of the 313 sites from the SED were subsequently used for the Atlas Linguarum Europae, a project that compared dialects and languages across all countries in Europe. The ALE data were collected in the late 1970s and often showed reduced lexical variation from the SED, or even a universal term where previously several had been recorded (e.g. the word "icicle" displaced all other variants).

In May 2007 the Arts and Humanities Research Council awarded a grant to the University of Leeds to enable a team led by Sally Johnson, Professor of Linguistics and Phonetics and Clive Upton, Professor of Modern English Language to study British regional dialects. The team analysed the results from the "Voices project" run by the BBC, in which the public sent in examples of English still spoken throughout the country. The BBC Voices project also collected hundreds of news articles about how the British speak English from swearing through to items on language schools. This information was collated and analysed both for content and where it was reported. Work on the project ended in 2010. Reports of its analyses were published in Analysing Twenty-first Century British English (2013), edited by Clive Upton and Bethan L. Davies.

In October 2017, a National Lottery grant of £798,000 was awarded to the University of Leeds to undertake a project named Dialect and Heritage: the State of the Nation. The project is due to run with five museums in different parts of England to open up the materials found by the Survey to a modern audience. In November 2019, an article in The Guardian noted that this work was progressing under Fiona Douglas from Leeds School of English with help from three living fieldworkers from the original survey.

== See also ==
- Survey of Anglo-Welsh Dialects
- Cockney
- Cumbrian dialect
- East Anglian English
- East Midlands English
- Pitmatic
- Welsh English
- West Country dialects
- West Midlands English
- Yorkshire dialect and accent

== Bibliography (selection) ==
- McDavid, Raven I. Jr. (1981). "Review of The Linguistic Atlas of England, by Harold Orton, Stewart Sanderson and John Widdowson." American Speech 56, 219–234.
- Fischer, Andreas; Ammann, Daniel (1991). "An Index to Dialect Maps of Great Britain". Varieties of English Around the World. General Series 10. Amsterdam/Philadelphia: John Benjamins.
- Kolb, Eduard (1966). Phonological Atlas of the Northern Region: the Six Northern Counties, North Lincolnshire and the Isle of Man. Bern: Francke.
- Meier, Hans Heinrich (1964). "Review of Introduction by Harold Orton and The Basic Material, Volume I by Harold Orton and Wilfrid J. Halliday." English Studies 45, 240–245.
- Orton, Harold (1971). Editorial Problems of an English Dialect Atlas. In: Burghardt, Lorraine H. (ed.): Dialectology: Problems and Perspectives. Knoxville: Univ. of Tennessee, pp. 79–115.
- Orton, Harold; Dieth, Eugen (1952). A Questionnaire for a Linguistic Atlas of England. Leeds: Leeds Philosophical and Literary Society.
- Orton, Harold; Wright, Nathalia (1974). A Word Geography of England. New York: Seminar Press.
- Orton, Harold et al. (1962–71). Survey of English Dialects: Basic Materials. Introduction and 4 vols. (each in 3 parts). Leeds: E. J. Arnold & Son.
- Upton, Clive; Sanderson, Stewart; Widdowson, J. D. A. (1987). Word Maps: A Dialect Atlas of England. London, New York, Sydney: Croom Helm. [Reprinted 2015 Routledge Library Editions, The English Language, Volume 27. London and New York: Routledge].
- Upton, Clive; Parry, David; Widdowson, J. D. A. (1994). Survey of English Dialects: The Dictionary and Grammar. London and New York: Routledge.
- Upton, Clive; Widdowson, J. D. A. (2006). An Atlas of English Dialects. 2nd ed. London and New York: Routledge.
- Upton, Clive; Davies, Bethan L. (2013). Analysing Twenty-first Century British English: Conceptual and methodological aspects of the Voices Project. Abingdon and New York: Routledge.
- Viereck, Wolfgang (1990). The Computer-Developed Linguistic Atlas of England. Tübingen: Niemeyer.
- Viereck, Wolfgang; Ramisch, Heinrich (1997). The Computer Developed Linguistic Atlas of England 2. Tübingen: Niemeyer.
