= Milena Petkovic =

Serbian handball player (born 1993)

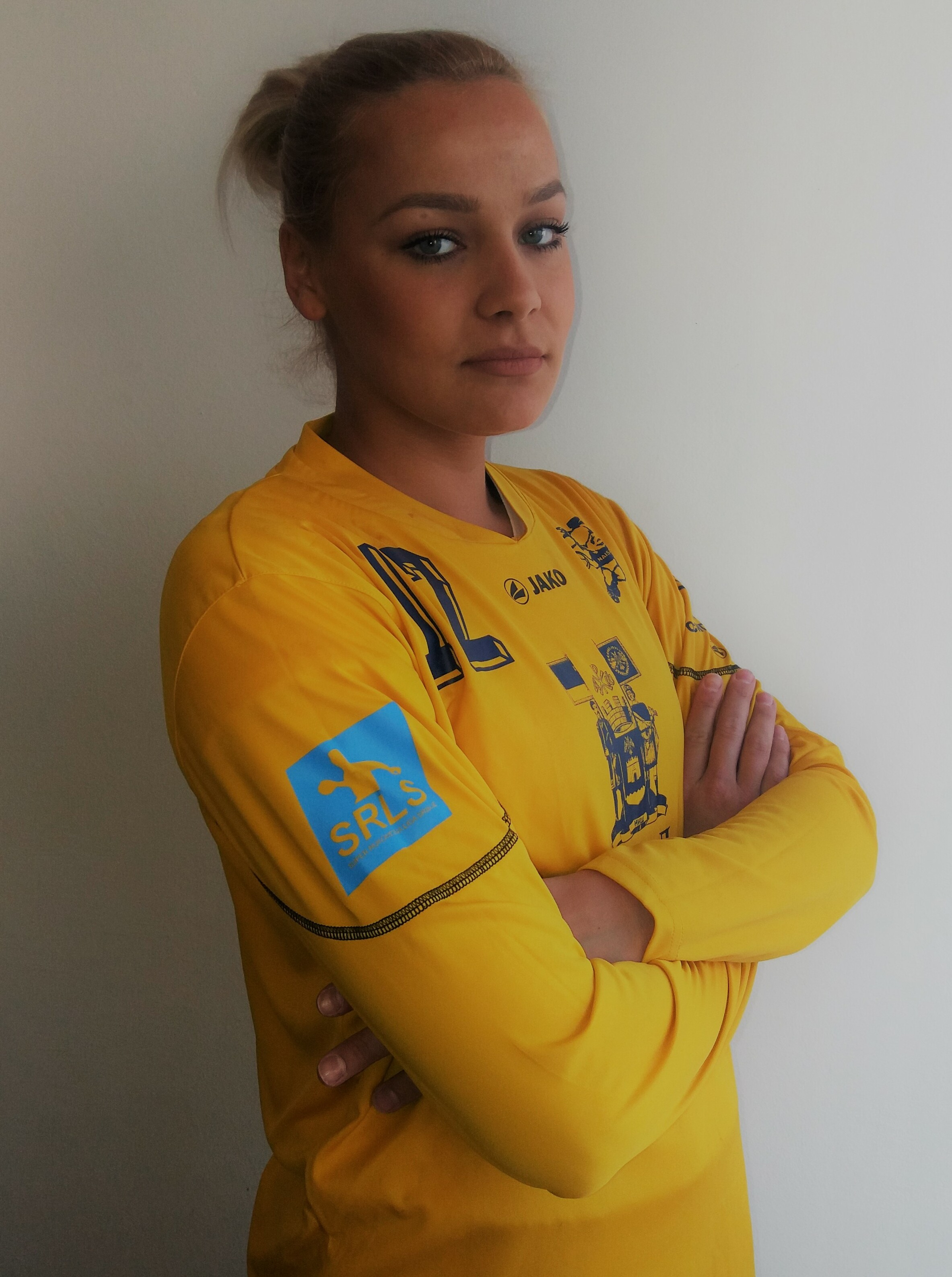

Milena Petkovic (Serbian Cyrillic: Милена Петковић; born 28 May 1993) is a Serbian professional handball player

== International competitions ==
- EHF Cup: 2011/12, 2015/16, 2016/17
- Challenge Cup: 2013/14, 2014/15.
