= Milena Büchs =

German ecological economist

Academic background
- Education: Humboldt University of Berlin (PhD)
- Thesis: New governance in European social policy : the open method of coordination
- Doctoral advisor: Claus Offe

Academic work
- Discipline: Sociology, ecological economics
- Institutions: University of Leeds

Milena Büchs is a German social scientist and economist who is Professor of Sustainable Welfare at the University of Leeds. She is known for her work on just transitions and the distributional impacts of climate policy.

== Education and career ==
Büchs studied political science, sociology, and economics at the Free University of Berlin. She completed a PhD in social policy at the Humboldt University Berlin, and worked at a lecturer and later associate professor at the University of Southampton before moving to Leeds in 2016. She was promoted to full professor in 2022.

== Research ==
Her research covers topics of sustainable welfare and just transitions, including the analysis of how the welfare state should change to meet everyone's needs but stay within planetary boundaries. This includes research on how to reduce energy demand. Her work further focuses postgrowth, universal basic services and distributional impacts of climate policy.

In 2017, Büchs wrote Postgrowth and wellbeing – challenges to sustainable welfare, in collaboration with Max Koch. The book analyses the complex relationship between economic growth and welfare states within the context of ecological and societal limits. They trace the historical roots of the growth paradigm and its interrelation with welfare systems, arguing that economic expansion once supported social cohesion but is now unsustainable. The authors examine critiques of growth from ecological and social perspectives and assess postgrowth alternatives, including steady-state economies and theories of human needs. They propose ecosocial policies – such as ecological taxation, income limits, and reduced working hours – as part of a transition to a just, sustainable society.

== Selected publications ==
- Büchs, Milena; Schnepf, Sylke V. (2013). "Who emits most? Associations between socio-economic factors and UK households' home energy, transport, indirect and total CO2 emissions". Ecological Economics. 90: 114–123. doi:10.1016/j.ecolecon.2013.03.007. ISSN 0921-8009.
- Büchs, Milena; Bardsley, Nicholas; Duwe, Sebastian (2011-05-01). "Who bears the brunt? Distributional effects of climate change mitigation policies". Critical Social Policy. 31 (2): 285–307. doi:10.1177/0261018310396036. ISSN 0261-0183.
- Büchs, Milena; Koch, Max (2019-01-01). "Challenges for the degrowth transition: The debate about wellbeing". Futures. 105: 155–165. doi:10.1016/j.futures.2018.09.002. ISSN 0016-3287.
