= David Parry (dialectologist) =

British dialectologist (1937–2022)

David Parry (1937 – 1 June 2022) was a British dialectologist. He received his education from the University of Sheffield and the University of Leeds; working at the latter school for the renowned dialectologist Harold Orton. He then taught dialectology for almost three decades at Swansea University.

Parry is best known for establishing the Survey of Anglo-Welsh Dialects (SAWD) at Swansea University. He founded the SAWD in 1968 with the aim of recording the "conservative forms" of Welsh English spoken in rural locations in Wales using the same methodology as the Survey of English Dialects (1950-1961). The survey analysed pronunciation, lexis, morphology and syntax based on interviews with informants in ninety locations, who were to be over sixty years of age. The results of the survey for south-east and south-west Wales were published as two volumes in 1977 and 1979. To these a companion volume on north Wales was added in 1991.
