= Survey of Anglo-Welsh Dialects =

The Survey of Anglo-Welsh Dialects (SAWD) commenced in 1968 under the direction of David Parry of University College, Swansea. The aim was to record the "conservative forms" of Welsh English spoken in rural locations in Wales. The methodology was based on that used in the Survey of English Dialects carried out between 1950 and 1961. The survey analysed pronunciation, lexis, morphology and syntax based on interviews with respondents in ninety locations, who were to be over sixty years of age.

The results of the survey for south-east and south-west Wales were published as two volumes in 1977 and 1979. To these a companion volume on north Wales was added in 1991

A second (urban) phase (SAWD II) covering four towns in different parts of Wales was started by Robert Penhallurick in 1986. The towns chosen were Caernarfon, Carmarthen, Wrexham and the Grangetown area of Cardiff.

Robert Penhallurick (currently of the University of Swansea) is now the custodian of the SAWD Archive.

A similar survey on dialects in the South Wales valleys was later carried out by the South Wales Miners Library.
