= Max Leopold Wagner =

German philologist and ethnologist (1880–1962)

Max Leopold Wagner (17 September 1880 – 9 July 1962) was a German philologist and ethnologist, particularly known for his studies on the Sardinian language. He also carried out pioneering research on the Spanish language in Hispanic America. In a posthumous review of his three-volume Dizionario etimologico sardo, Ernst Pulgram wrote: It can only be hoped that ... there will arise ... men like Wagner: original thinkers, deep specialists, and great synthesizers of knowledge all at the same time.

== Biography ==
Wagner was born in Munich. Wagner gained his doctorate from the University of Würzburg, Germany; his thesis was entitled Lautlehre der südsardischen Mundarten (published in 1907). He then taught languages in Istanbul, learning Arabic, Greek, Turkish and Romanian. He started to study Judaeo-Spanish and became interested in Hispanic studies, moving to Mexico in 1913 and subsequently travelling in Latin America. He returned to Germany after the start of the First World War, taking a position at the University of Berlin. In the mid-1920s, he moved to Italy, spending most of his time in Rome and Naples, and working on the Italian linguistic atlas, AIS - Sprach- und Sachatlas Italiens und der Südschweiz, under Karl Jaberg and Jakob Jud.

He held an academic position at the University of Coimbra, Portugal (1947–51), as well as a guest professorship at the University of Illinois, USA (1948–49). He then moved to Washington, D.C., where he worked on his Dizionario etimologico sardo, with the assistance of Raffaele Urciolo, until his death in Washington, D.C. in 1962.

== Research ==
Wagner did research in the context of the Sardinian language, also studying the jargons and dialects of Sicily, Judaeo-Spanish, Portuguese, Catalan and American Spanish. His comprehensive synthesis of American-Spanish linguistics, published in 1949, was the first extended study of the language. He also studied the relationship between the Berber languages and Romance languages and in general conducted studies on the languages and cultures of the peoples of the Mediterranean Sea.

He had a particular interest in argot, cant, and the idioms of those living on the margins of society, as evidenced in his essay Comments on the bogotanian caló, a text about the manners of speech of impoverished children in Bogotá.

== Selected works ==
- Fonetica storica del sardo, by Max Leopold Wagner, ed. Trois, Cagliari, 1984
- Dizionario etimologico sardo (1960, 1962, 1964)
- La lingua sarda (1951)
- Apuntaciones sobre el caló bogotano (1950)
- Lingua e dialetti dell'America spagnola (1949)
- Historische Lautlehre des Sardischen (1941); Fonetica storica del sardo, Italian translation by Giulio Paulis, ed. Trois, Cagliari, 1984
- Caracteres generales del judeo-español de Oriente (1930)
- Die spanisch-amerikanische Literatur in ihren Hauptströmungen (1924)
- Amerikanisch-spanisch und Vulgärlatein (1920)
