= Jean-Pierre Rousselot =

French priest and phonetician (1846–1924)

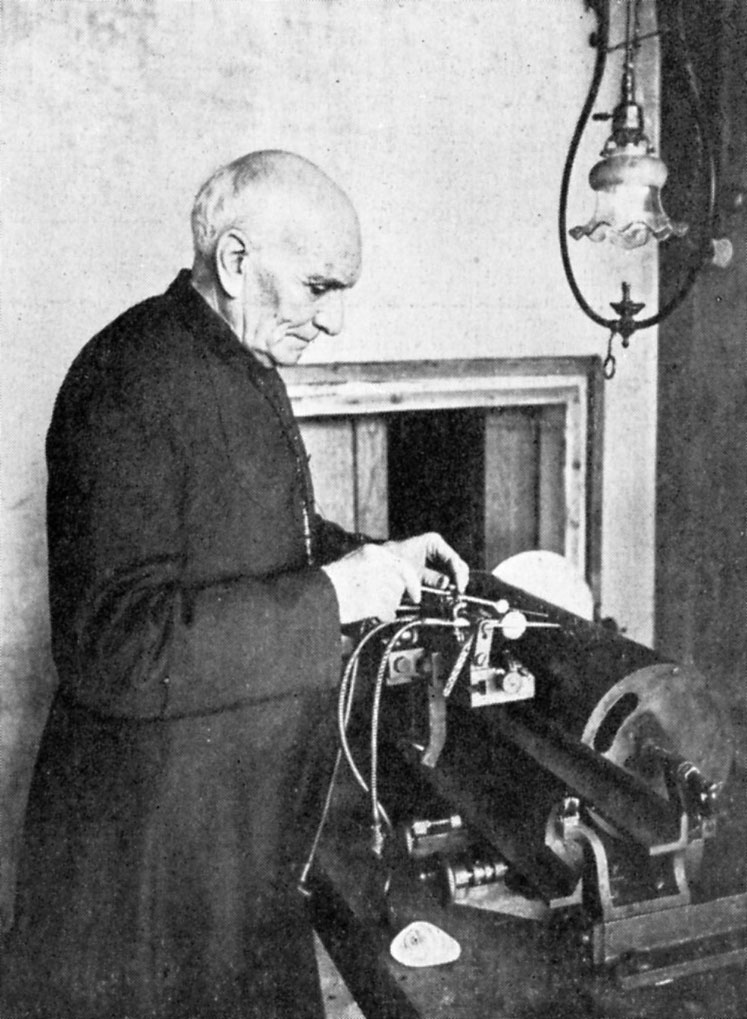
Abbé Rousselot

Jean-Pierre Rousselot (English: /ruːsəˈloʊ/ roo-suh-LOH, French: [ʒɑ̃ pjɛʁ ʁuslo]; 14 October 1846, Saint-Claud – 16 December 1924, Paris) was a French Catholic priest who was an important phonetician and dialectologist.

Rousselot is considered the founder of experimental phonetics, both theoretical and applied, as manifested in the two volumes of his Principes de Phonétique Expérimentale (1897, 1901). He influenced many phoneticians and linguists, including Josef Chlumsky, Jean Poirot, Giulio Panconcelli-Calzia, Théodore Rosset, George Oscar Russell, Raymond Herbert Stetson, and Lev Shcherba.

With Hubert Pernot, he was editor of the journal Revue de phonétique. He also founded, with Jules Gilliéron, the Revue des patois gallo-romans ("Journal of Gallo-Romance Dialects").

== Selected works ==
- De vocabulorum congruentia in rustico cellae-fruini sermone, 1892.
- La Phonétique expérimentale, 1897.
- Études de prononciations parisiennes, 1899.
- Historique des applications pratiques de la phonétique expérimentale, 1899.
- Principes de phonétique expérimentale (2 volumes).
- Précis de prononciation française, 1902.
- Premiers éléments de prononciation française, 1903.
