= Dialect continuum =

Geographic range of dialects that vary more strongly at the distant ends

A dialect continuum or dialect chain is a series of language varieties spoken across some geographical area such that neighboring varieties are mutually intelligible, but the differences accumulate over distance so that widely separated varieties may not be. This is a typical occurrence with widely spread languages and language families around the world, when these languages did not spread recently. Some prominent examples include the Indo-Aryan languages across large parts of India, varieties of Arabic across north Africa and southwest Asia, the Turkic languages, the varieties of Chinese, and parts of the Romance, Germanic and Slavic families in Europe. Terms used in older literature include dialect area (Leonard Bloomfield) and L-complex (Charles F. Hockett).

Dialect continua typically occur in long-settled agrarian populations, as innovations spread from their various points of origin as waves. In this situation, hierarchical classifications of varieties are impractical. Instead, dialectologists map variation of various language features across a dialect continuum, drawing lines called isoglosses between areas that differ with respect to some feature.

A variety within a dialect continuum may be developed and codified as a standard language, and then serve as an authority for part of the continuum, e.g. within a particular political unit or geographical area. Since the early 20th century, the increasing dominance of nation-states and their standard languages has been steadily eliminating the nonstandard dialects that comprise dialect continua, making the boundaries ever more abrupt and well-defined.

== Dialect geography ==
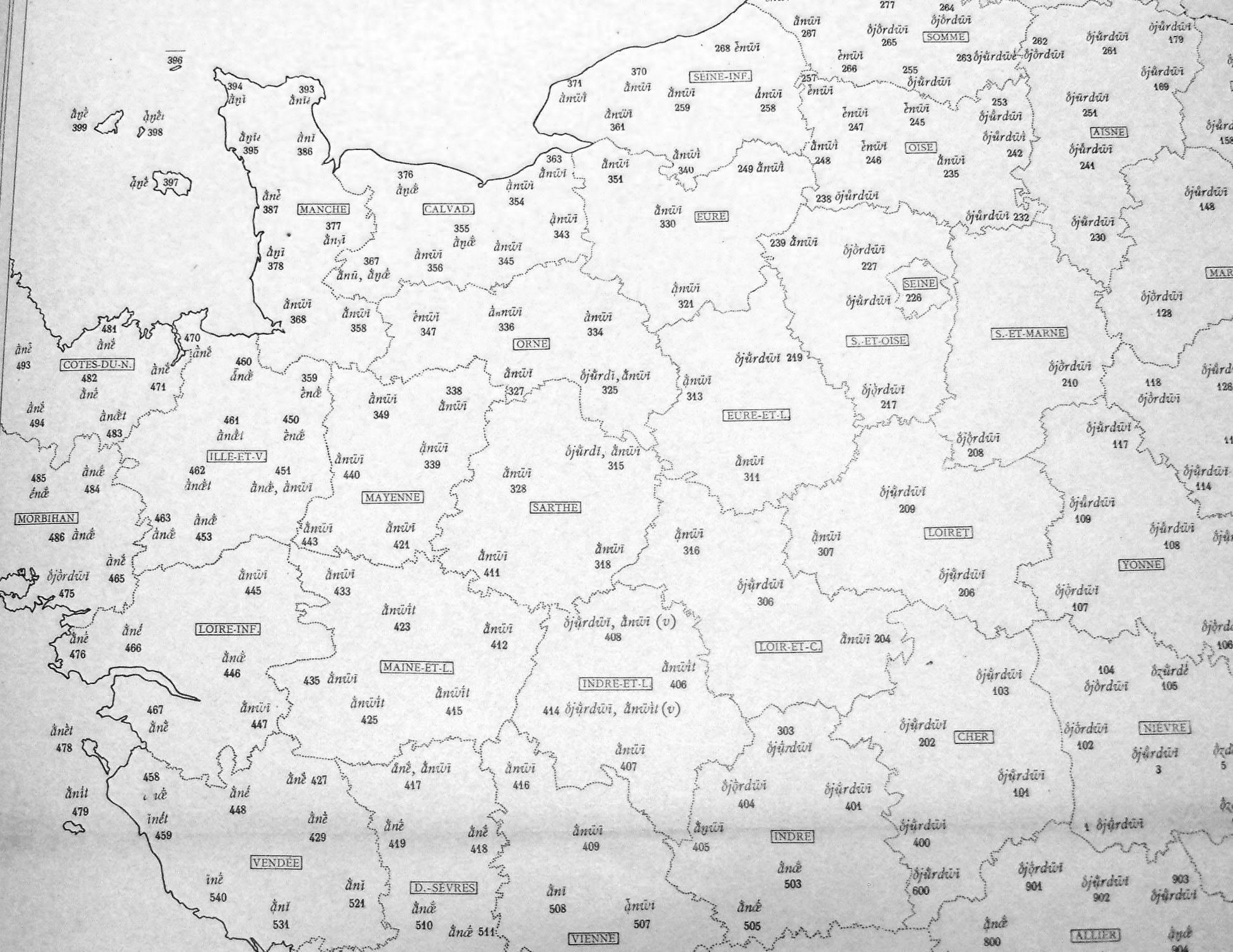
Part of map 72 of the Atlas linguistique de la France, recording local forms meaning "today"

Dialectologists record variation across a dialect continuum using maps of various features collected in a linguistic atlas, beginning with an atlas of German dialects by Georg Wenker (from 1888), based on a postal survey of schoolmasters. The influential Atlas linguistique de la France (1902–10) pioneered the use of a trained fieldworker. These atlases typically consist of display maps, each showing local forms of a particular item at the survey locations.

Secondary studies may include interpretive maps, showing the areal distribution of various variants. A common tool in these maps is an isogloss, a line separating areas where different variants of a particular feature predominate.

In a dialect continuum, isoglosses for different features are typically spread out, reflecting the gradual transition between varieties. A bundle of coinciding isoglosses indicates a stronger dialect boundary, as might occur at geographical obstacles or long-standing political boundaries. In other cases, intersecting isoglosses and more complex patterns are found.

== Relationship with standard varieties ==
Local dialects of the West Germanic continuum are oriented towards either Standard Dutch or Standard German, depending on which side of the international border they are spoken.

Standard varieties may be developed and codified at one or more locations in a continuum until they have independent cultural status (autonomy), a process the German linguist Heinz Kloss called ausbau. Speakers of local varieties typically read and write a related standard variety (called the Dachsprache or roof language), use it for official purposes, hear it on radio and television, and consider it the standard form of their speech, so that any standardizing changes in their speech are towards that variety. In such cases the local variety is said to be dependent on, or heteronomous with respect to, the standard variety.

A standard variety together with its dependent varieties is commonly considered a "language", with the dependent varieties called "dialects" of the language, even if the standard is mutually intelligible with another standard from the same continuum. The Scandinavian languages, Danish, Norwegian and Swedish, are often cited as examples. Conversely, a language defined in this way may include local varieties that are mutually unintelligible, such as the German dialects.

The choice of standard is often determined by a political boundary, which may cut across a dialect continuum. As a result, speakers on either side of the boundary may use almost identical varieties, but treat them as dependent on different standards, and thus part of different "languages". The various local dialects then tend to be leveled towards their respective standard varieties, disrupting the previous dialect continuum. Examples include the boundaries between Dutch and German, between Czech, Slovak and Polish, and between Belarusian and Ukrainian.

During the time of the former Socialist Republic of Macedonia, a standard was developed from local varieties of Eastern South Slavic, within a continuum with Torlakian to the north and Bulgarian to the east. The standard was based on varieties that were most different from standard Bulgarian. Now known as Macedonian, it is the national standard of North Macedonia, but viewed by Bulgarians as a dialect of Bulgarian.

== Europe ==
Major dialect continua in Europe in the mid-20th century (Note: Carpathian Ruthenia is mistakenly excluded from North Slavic on the map, even though Rusyn, an East Slavic dialect group on the transition to West Slavic, is spoken there.)

Europe provides several examples of dialect continua from the Germanic, Romance and Slavic branches of the Indo-European language family.

=== Germanic languages ===
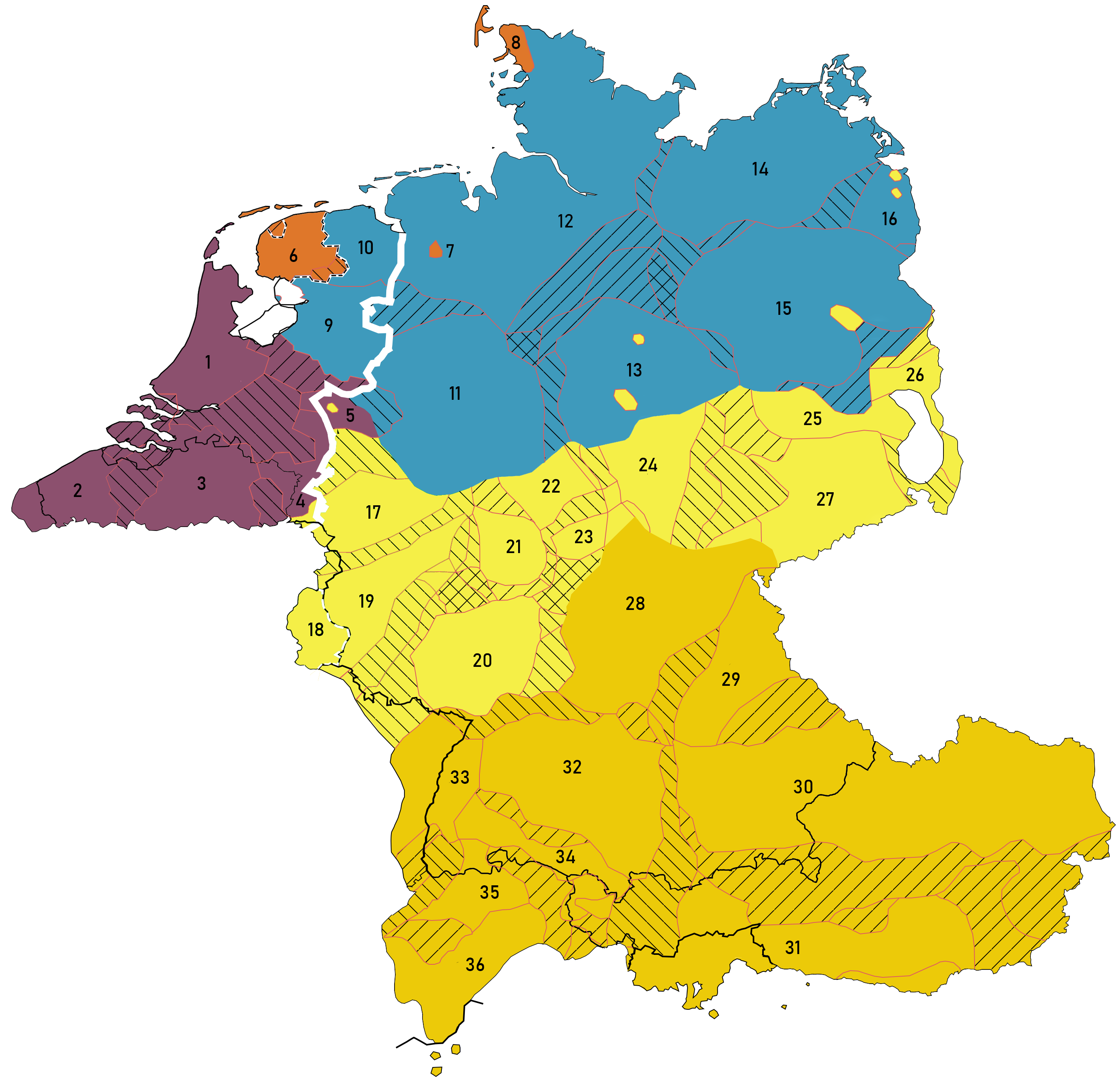
The varieties of the continental West Germanic dialect continuum after 1945: Frisian Low Franconian Low Saxon/Low German Central German (part of High German) Upper German (part of High German)

==== Continental West Germanic languages ====
Historically, the Dutch, Frisian, Low Saxon and High German dialects formed a canonical dialect continuum, which has been gradually falling apart since the Late Middle Ages due to the pressures of modern education, standard languages, migration and weakening knowledge of the dialects.

The transition from German dialects to Dutch variants followed two basic routes:

- From Central German to Southeastern Dutch (Limburgish) in the so-called Rhenish fan, an area corresponding largely to the modern Niederrhein in which gradual but geographically compact changes took place.
- From Low Saxon (Note: In this context, "A group of related dialects of Low German, spoken in northern Germany and parts of the Netherlands, formerly also in Denmark." (Definition from Wiktionary)) to Northwestern Dutch (Hollandic): This sub-continuum also included West Frisian dialects up until the 17th century, but faced external pressure from Standard Dutch and, after the collapse of the Hanseatic League, from Standard German which greatly influenced the vocabularies of these border dialects.

Although the internal dialect continua of both Dutch and German remain largely intact, the broader continuum that once connected Dutch, Frisian, and German has largely disintegrated. Fragmentary areas of the Dutch-German border in which language change is more gradual than in other sections or a higher degree of mutual intelligibility is present still exist, such as the Aachen-Kerkrade area, but the historical chain in which dialects were only divided by minor isoglosses and negligible differences in vocabulary has seen a rapid and ever-increasing decline since the 1850s.

Standard Dutch was based on the dialects of the principal Brabantic and Hollandic cities. The written form of Standard German originated in the East Central German used at the chancery of the kingdom of Saxony, while the spoken form emerged later, based on North German pronunciations of the written standard. Being based on widely separated dialects, the Dutch and German standards do not show a high degree of mutual intelligibility when spoken and only partially so when written. One study concluded that, when concerning written language, Dutch speakers could translate 50.2% of the provided German words correctly, while the German subjects were able to translate 41.9% of the Dutch equivalents correctly. In terms of orthography, 22% of the vocabulary of Dutch and German is identical or near-identical.

=== Romance languages ===
==== Western Romance languages ====
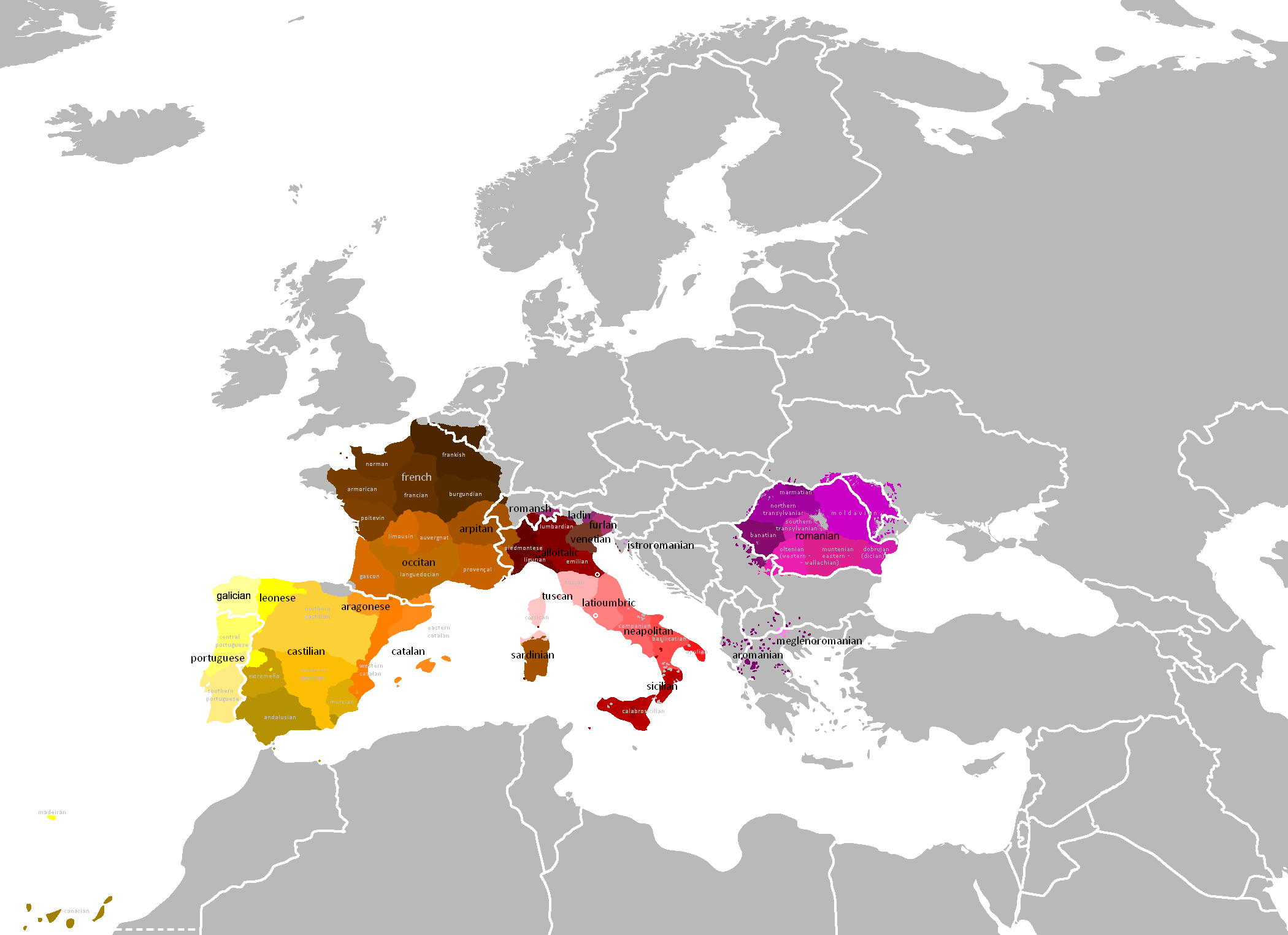
Romance languages in Europe

The western continuum of Romance languages comprises, from West to East: in Portugal, Portuguese; in Spain, Galician, Leonese or Asturian, Castilian or Spanish, Aragonese and Catalan or Valencian; in France, Occitan, Franco-Provençal, standard French and Corsican which is closely related to Italian; in Italy, Ligurian, Piedmontese, Lombard, Emilian, Romagnol, Italian Gallo-Picene, Venetian, Friulian, Ladin; and in Switzerland, Lombard and Romansh.

In recent centuries, the intermediate dialects between the major Romance languages have been moving toward extinction, as their speakers have switched to varieties closer to the more prestigious national standards. This has occurred in France, owing to the French government's refusal to recognise minority languages. Also, the Romance languages of Italy are a less arguable example of a dialect continuum. For many decades since Italy's unification, the attitude of the French government towards the ethnolinguistic minorities was copied by the Italian government.

=== Slavic languages ===
Conventionally, on the basis of extralinguistic features (such as writing systems or the former western frontier of the Soviet Union), the North Slavic continuum is split into East and West Slavic continua. From the perspective of linguistic features alone, only two Slavic (dialect) continua can be distinguished, namely North and South.

==== South Slavic languages ====
South Slavic dialect continuum with major dialect groups

All South Slavic languages form a dialect continuum. These languages are spoken in Slovenia, Croatia, Bosnia and Herzegovina, Montenegro, Serbia, North Macedonia, and Bulgaria. Standard Slovene, Macedonian, and Bulgarian are each based on a distinct dialect, but the Bosnian, Croatian, Montenegrin, and Serbian standard varieties of the pluricentric Serbo-Croatian language are all based on the same dialect, Shtokavian. Therefore, Croats, Serbs, Bosniaks and Montenegrins, can communicate fluently with each other if they speak a Shtokavian lect, for example their respective standardized varieties. Native speakers of Shtokavian may struggle to understand distinct Kajkavian or Chakavian dialects (located in Croatia), as might the speakers of the two with each other (though there are varieties that act as transitions from each idiom to the other, and varieties of Kajkavian and Chakavian that are transitional to Slovenian).

=== Goidelic languages ===
The Goidelic languages consist of Irish, Scottish Gaelic and Manx. Prior to the 19th and 20th centuries, the continuum existed throughout Ireland, the Isle of Man and Scotland. Many intermediate dialects have become extinct or have died out leaving major gaps between languages such as in the islands of Rathlin, Arran or Kintyre.

== Middle East ==
=== Arabic ===
Arabic is a standard case of diglossia. The standard written language, Modern Standard Arabic, is based on the Classical Arabic of the Qur'an, while the modern vernacular dialects (or languages) branched from ancient Arabic dialects, from North Western Africa through Egypt, Sudan, and the Fertile Crescent to the Arabian Peninsula and Iraq. The dialects use different analogues from the Arabic language inventory and have been influenced by different substrate and superstrate languages. Adjacent dialects are mutually understandable to a large extent, but those from distant regions are more difficult to understand.

=== Aramaic ===
All modern Aramaic languages descend from a dialect continuum that historically existed through the Aramaization of the Levant (other than the original Aramaic-speaking parts) and Mesopotamia and before the Islamicization of the Levant and Mesopotamia. Northeastern Neo-Aramaic, including distinct varieties spoken by both Jews and Christians, is a dialect continuum although greatly disrupted by population displacement during the twentieth century.

=== Armenian ===
The Armenian language has two standardized forms: Western Armenian and Eastern Armenian. Before the Armenian genocide and other significant demographic changes that affected the Armenians, several dozen Armenian dialects existed in the areas historically populated by them. The most notable overarching survey of the Armenian dialects is the Classification des dialectes arméniens (Classification of Armenian dialects), a 1909 book by the Armenian linguist Hrachia Acharian, published in Paris. It is Acharian's translation into French of his original work Hay Barbaṙagitutʿiwn ("Armenian Dialectology") that was later published as a book in 1911 in Moscow and New Nakhichevan. The French translation lacks dialectal examples. An English translation was published in 2024.

== Turkic ==
Turkic languages are best described as a dialect continuum. Structurally, the Turkic languages are very close to one another, and they share basic features such as SOV word order, vowel harmony (except the Karluk sub-branch and Khalaj) and agglutination.

== Indo-Aryan languages ==
Most of the Indo-Aryan languages of the Indian subcontinent form a dialect continuum. What is called Hindi in India is frequently Standard Hindi, the Sanskritized register of the colloquial Hindustani spoken in the Delhi area, contrasted with the register Urdu. The Indo-Aryan Prakrits also gave rise to languages like Gujarati, Assamese, Maithili, Bengali, Odia, Nepali, Marathi, Konkani and Punjabi. Much of these languages, including Punjabi and Bengali, have their own dialect continuums.

== Chinese ==
Areas of Chinese dialect groups

Chinese consists of hundreds of mutually unintelligible local varieties. The differences are similar to those within the Romance languages, which are similarly descended from a language spread by imperial expansion over substrate languages 2000 years ago. Unlike Europe, however, Chinese political unity was restored in the late 6th century and has persisted (with interludes of division) until the present day. There are no equivalents of the local standard literary languages that developed in the numerous independent states of Europe.

Chinese dialectologists have divided the local varieties into a number of dialect groups, largely based on phonological developments in comparison with Middle Chinese. Most of these groups are found in the rugged terrain of the southeast, reflecting the greater variation in this area, particularly in Fujian. Each of these groups contains numerous mutually unintelligible varieties. Moreover, in many cases the transitions between groups are smooth, as a result of centuries of interaction and multilingualism.

The boundaries between the northern Mandarin area and the central groups, Wu, Gan and Xiang, are particularly weak, due to the steady flow of northern features into these areas. Transitional varieties between the Wu, Gan and Mandarin groups have been variously classified, with some scholars assigning them to a separate Hui group. The boundaries between Gan, Hakka and Min are similarly indistinct. Pinghua and Yue form a dialect continuum (excluding urban enclaves of Cantonese). There are sharper boundaries resulting from more recent expansion between Hakka and Yue, and between Southwestern Mandarin and Yue, but even here there has been considerable convergence in contact areas.

== Cree ==
Cree is a group of closely related Algonquian languages that are distributed from Alberta to Labrador in Canada. They form the Cree–Montagnais–Naskapi dialect continuum, with around 117,410 speakers. The languages can be roughly classified into nine groups, from west to east:

- Plains Cree (y-dialect)
- Woods Cree or Woods/Rocky Cree (ð-dialect)
- Swampy Cree (n-dialect)
  - Eastern Swampy Cree
  - Western Swampy Cree
- Moose Cree (l-dialect)
- East Cree or James Bay Cree (y-dialect)
  - Northern East Cree
  - Southern East Cree
- Atikamekw (r-dialect)
- Western Montagnais (l-dialect)
- Innu-aimun or Eastern Montagnais (n-dialect)
- Naskapi (y-dialect)

Various Cree languages are used as languages of instruction and taught as subjects: Plains Cree, Eastern Cree, Montagnais, etc. Mutual intelligibility between some dialects can be low. There is no accepted standard dialect.

== Ethiopia ==
Several dialect continua are known among the numerous languages of Ethiopia, including the Ometo languages, Konsoid languages and Dullay languages. In none of these examples does an overarching linguistic identity exist, with speakers identifying as members of smaller but mutually intelligible dialect areas.

== See also ==
- A language is a dialect with an army and navy (an aphorism spread among linguists)
- Dialect, including the classification units "dialect cluster", "language cluster" and "dialect group"
- Dialect levelling
- Dialectometry
- Diasystem
- Diglossia
- Koine language
- Language secessionism
- Linkage (linguistics)
- Macrolanguage
- Post-creole speech continuum
- Ring species, an analogous concept in ecology
