= Édouard Champion =

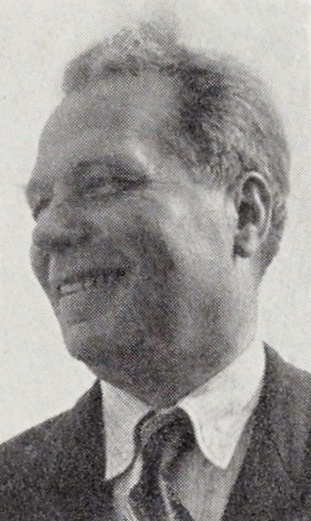
- Champion in 1938
- Born: Édouard Jean-Marie Champion; October 10, 1882; Paris, France
- Died: February 27, 1938 (aged 55); Paris, France
- Occupations: Publisher, bookseller, historiographer, writer
- Spouse: Julia Hunt (m. 1915)
- Parent: Honoré Champion (father)
- Relatives: Pierre Champion (brother)

Édouard Jean-Marie Champion (10 October 1882 – 27 February 1938) was a French publisher, bookseller, author, and literary historian based in Paris. He managed the publishing house and bookstore Éditions Honoré Champion, served as the official historiographer of the Comédie-Française, and was the founder and first curator of the art museum Musée du Touquet-Paris-Plage.

== Early life and family ==
Édouard Jean-Marie Champion was born on 10 October 1882 in the 6th arrondissement of Paris. He was the son of Honoré Champion (1846–1913), a prominent bookseller and publisher, and Émelie Antoinette Gérard. His older brother, Pierre Champion (1880–1942), became a noted historian of medieval Paris, Joan of Arc, and Louis XI.

On 13 November 1915, Champion married Julia Hunt (1876–1958) in the 16th arrondissement of Paris. Their daughter, Marie-Louise Julia Pierrette Jeanne Émilie Champion (born 1916), married Jean Ferdinand Loubet in 1936.

During World War I, Champion served as a reserve lieutenant in the 26th Battalion of Chasseurs à pied (1914–1919). He was awarded the Croix de guerre with division and battalion citations.

== Publishing career and literary activities ==
Upon the death of his father in 1913, Édouard Champion took over the management of the bookstore Éditions Honoré Champion, located on the Quai Malaquais in Paris. The establishment was known for its scholarly works on medieval and Renaissance literature. Champion served as publisher for the École des Hautes Études, publishing 232 volumes. One publication of note was the Atlas linguistique de la France. As a bookseller, he acted as a purchasing agent who arranged the export of French books to various buyers, including the British Museum and Harvard University.

Champion was a member of the Société des gens de lettres, joining in 1916.

After World War I, Champion sold the retail bookstore to focus on publishing, historiography, and building his personal collection of manuscripts and rare editions. His collection included annotated copies of works by Stendhal, Charles Baudelaire, Prosper Mérimée, Gérard de Nerval, and Gabriele d'Annunzio.

In 1927, Champion succeeded Alexandre Joannidès as historiographer of the Comédie-Française, publishing annual multi-volume reference registers documenting the daily repertoire and history of the theater.

Champion edited and published the limited-edition series Les Amis d'Édouard sont les plus aimables amis du monde ("Édouard's friends are the most amiable friends in the world"), a set of 166 pamphlets named after a phrase coined by Anatole France. The first two volumes were written by Maurice Barrès and Charles Maurras, and the final 166th volume by Henri Massis.

In 1927, Champion undertook a 120-day lecture tour across the United States and Canada sponsored by Harvard University, delivering 102 lectures across the continent. Upon his return, he published "Le Livre aux États-Unis" in the Revue des Deux Mondes.

== Le Touquet-Paris-Plage ==
Champion maintained a secondary residence, the villa "Golf Cottage", at Le Touquet-Paris-Plage in Northern France. He was elected a member of the Société académique du Touquet-Paris-Plage in 1930 and served as First Deputy Mayor under Mayors Léon Soucaret and Jules Pouget.

On 9 July 1932, Champion inaugurated the Musée du Touquet-Paris-Plage and served as its first curator. He promoted the resort town, and invited literary, artistic, and theatrical figures, including Josephine Baker, Tristan Bernard, Henry Bordeaux, Sacha Guitry, Serge Lifar, W. Somerset Maugham, Mistinguett, Paul Morand, and Maurice Ravel. In 1935, he published the historical booklet Les Phares du Touquet au siècle dernier. Upon his death, he bequeathed his collection of paintings to the museum, which was later renamed the Musée Édouard Champion.

== Death and legacy ==
Champion died after a prolonged illness on 27 February 1938 in the 16th arrondissement of Paris, at the age of 55. His funeral took place on 3 March 1938 at the Church of Saint-Pierre-de-Chaillot in Paris. Attendees who spoke at his funeral included writer Jean Tharaud (for the Société des Gens de Lettres), critic Henry Malherbe, Mayor Jules Pouget of Le Touquet, and Édouard Bourdet, Administrator-General of the Comédie-Française. He was buried in Montparnasse Cemetery.

== Honors and awards ==
- Legion of Honour: Appointed Chevalier (Knight) on 28 March 1922 (Ministry proposal 20 March 1922); promoted to Officer on 4 October 1927.
- Croix de guerre 1914–1918: Cited in division orders (7 June 1916) and battalion orders (30 July 1916).
- The municipality of Le Touquet-Paris-Plage named a street, Allée Édouard Champion, in his honor.

== Selected works ==
- Champion, Édouard (1927). Retour d'Amérique. Les Amis d'Édouard 113. Paris: Éditions Champion.
- Champion, Édouard (1934–1938). La Comédie-Française (1927–1937). Vol. 1–4. Paris: Stock / Delamain et Boutelleau / Munier.
- Champion, Édouard (1935). Les Phares du Touquet au siècle dernier. Le Touquet-Paris-Plage.
- Champion, Édouard; Carlhian, Michel; Dubar, Jean; Canivet, Pierre; Ambroise, Paul (1936). Le Golf: Les ancêtres du jeu de golf, l'envers du décor et interviews. Paris: Nouvelle Édition française.
- Champion, Édouard (1937). Chateaubriand et George Sand : une page inédite des Mémoires d'outre-tombe. Paris: René Helleu.
