= Linguistic map =

Map showing geographic distribution of the speakers of a language

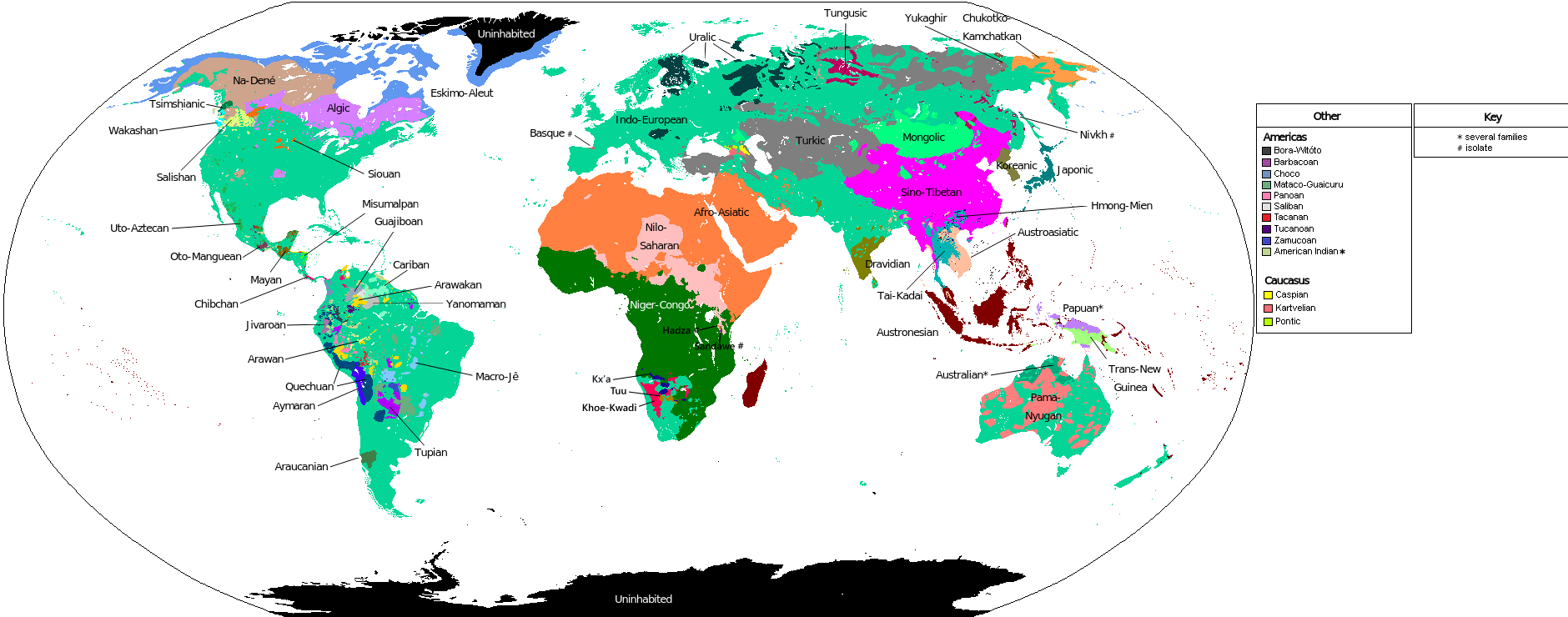
Language families of the world

Isoglosses of Faroese on the Faroe Islands, part of the Kingdom of Denmark

A linguistic map is a thematic map showing the geographic distribution of the speakers of a language, or isoglosses of a dialect continuum of the same language, or language family. A collection of such maps is a linguistic atlas.

The earliest such atlas was the Sprachatlas des Deutschen Reiches of Georg Wenker and Ferdinand Wrede, published beginning in 1888, followed by the Atlas Linguistique de la France, of Jules Gilliéron between 1902 and 1910, the Linguistischer Atlas des dacorumänischen Sprachgebietes published in 1909 by Gustav Weigand and the AIS - Sprach- und Sachatlas Italiens und der Südschweiz of Karl Jaberg and Jakob Jud, published 1928–1940. The first linguistic atlas of the US was published by Hans Kurath. The Linguistic Atlas of England was the result of the Survey of English Dialects, led by Harold Orton and Eugen Dieth.

The first computerised linguistic atlas was the Atlas Linguarum Europae, first published in 1975.

== See also ==
- Language geography
- Dialect continuum
- Historical linguistics
- Language border
- A Linguistic Atlas of Early Middle English
- Linguistic Atlas Project
- Lists of languages
