= Charles Bruneau =

French grammarian, linguist and philologist

- Born: 19 November 1883; Givet, France
- Died: 3 August 1969 (aged 85); Paris, France
- Burial place: Cimetière parisien de Bagneux
- Occupations: Grammarian, linguist, philologist

Academic background
- Education: University of Paris
- Academic advisor: Ferdinand Brunot

Academic work
- Institutions: University of Nancy; University of Paris; University of Bordeaux
- Doctoral students: Algirdas Greimas

Charles Bruneau (1883–1969) was a French grammarian, linguist and philologist.

== Biography ==
Bruneau grew up in a village where the language of communication was Walloon, but surrounded by areas where the regional language was Champenois. This prompted him, at the instigation of Jules Gilliéron, to conduct dialectological surveys throughout the region around Givet, both in France and Belgium. He was a grammar scholar (1906) and doctor of letters (1913).

His research was published in four books:

- Étude phonétique des patois d’Ardenne (1913), where he explained the phonetic notation system he would use.
- La limite des dialectes wallon, champenois et lorrain en Ardenne (1913) where he traced the boundaries of the three regional languages in question (Walloon, Champenois and Lorrain).
- Enquête linguistique sur les patois d’Ardenne, volume I (1914), where he gave the dialect forms, collected in his 93 locations, for the French words ranging from A to L (940 words, from abaisser to luzerne).
- Enquête linguistique sur les patois d’Ardenne, volume II (1926), idem for the rest of the alphabet (764 words, from ma to y).

Charles Bruneau took over Ferdinand Brunot's l’Histoire de la langue française after his death, publishing volumes xii and xiii (1948-1972). He also resumed and recast Précis de grammaire historique de la langue française, following which it was known as "Brunot and Bruneau".

He had four children, including Anne, mother of Pascal Quignard, and Jean, an academic expert on Gustave Flaubert.
