= Jules Gilliéron =

Swiss-French linguist and dialectologist (1854–1926)

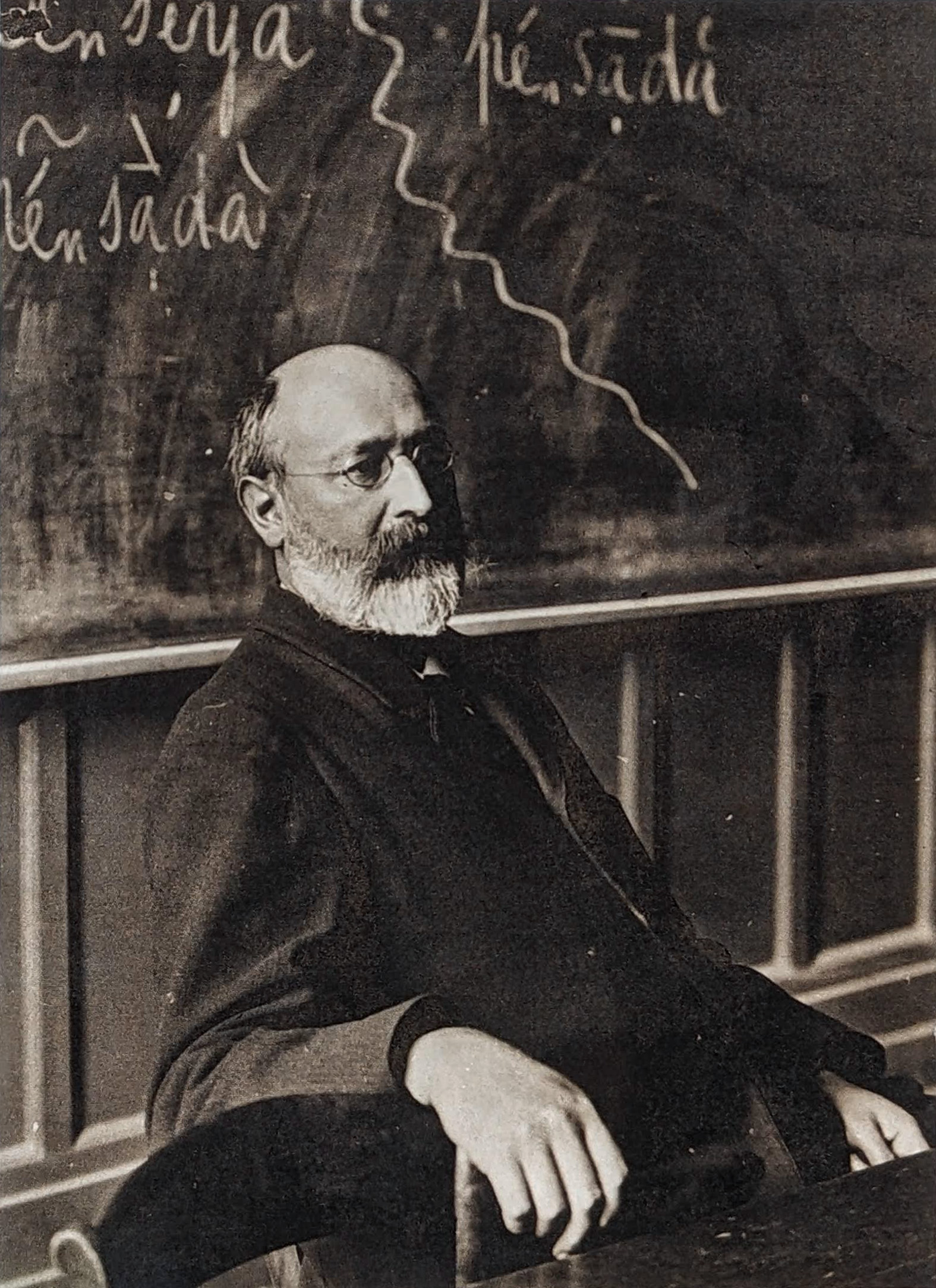
- Jules Gilliéron, c. 1905
- Born: Jules Louis Gilliéron; 21 December 1854; La Neuveville, Switzerland
- Died: 26 April 1926 (aged 71); Schernelz, Switzerland
- Citizenship: Switzerland; France (from 1886)
- Relatives: Émile Gilliéron (brother); Émile Gilliéron fils (nephew)
- Awards: Légion d'honneur (1913)

Academic background
- Education: École pratique des Hautes Études, Paris
- Thesis: Patois de la commune de Vionnaz (Bas-Valais) (1880)
- Influences: Gaston Paris; Michel Bréal

Academic work
- Discipline: Linguistics
- Sub-discipline: Linguistic geography
- Institutions: École pratique des Hautes Études, Paris
- Notable students: See § Students below
- Notable works: Atlas linguistique de la France

Jules Gilliéron (Note: French pronunciation: [ʒyl ʒijeʁɔ̃]) (21 December 1854 – 26 April 1926) was a Swiss-French linguist and dialectologist. Born and initially educated in Switzerland, he studied linguistics at the École pratique des Hautes Études in Paris, where he spent the remainder of his life. His mentors included Michel Bréal and Gaston Paris, who supported his academic career; Bréal helped him secure a lectureship at the École pratique in 1883. He became a French citizen in 1886, a professor in 1894, and assistant director of the École pratique by 1913, the same year he was awarded the Légion d'honneur.

Gilliéron's early publications in the field of linguistic geography included an 1880 study of the dialect of the Swiss town of Vionnaz and the Petit Atlas phonétique de Valais roman ('Little Phonetic Atlas of Roman Valais'). In the latter, he developed the methods he would later apply to larger projects, such as the use of a pre-prepared questionnaire. He co-founded an academic journal, the Revue des patois gallo-romans ('Journal of Gallo-Romance Dialects'), with Jean-Pierre Rousselot in 1887. He used a novel phonetic transcription system, developed with Rousselot, for the Atlas linguistique de la France ('Linguistic Atlas of France'; ALF), a complete linguistic atlas of the Gallo-Romance area. The ALF, which he produced in collaboration with a fieldworker, Edmond Edmont, was the first major linguistic atlas of a Romance language, and its methodology influenced subsequent works of linguistic geography. Karl Jaberg and Jakob Jud, two of Gilliéron's students, later applied his methods to Italy and southern Switzerland.

Gilliéron considered the proper object of etymology to be the whole history of words, rather than only their origins. He opposed the Neogrammarian view that language evolves through exceptionless laws of sound change, arguing that linguistic changes are not always uniform and are influenced by human psychology. He believed that speakers could only differentiate concepts for which they had discrete linguistic forms, and therefore viewed phenomena such as folk etymology as potentially "pathological" forces which could reduce the complexity and thus the usefulness of a language, and which require speakers to use "therapies" to counteract them.

Gilliéron has been called "the master of linguistic geography", and credited as the founder of scientific dialectology in France. His student body was highly international, and many of those who attended his lectures went on to be prominent in linguistics and related fields in countries throughout Europe.

== Biography ==
Jules Louis Gilliéron was born on 21 December 1854 in La Neuveville, near Bern in Switzerland, (Note: Veith 2006. For his date of birth, see "Gilliéron, Jules Louis (1854–1926)". Chamber's Encyclopaedia. Vol. 6. G. Newnes. 1959.) the youngest of the four sons of Jean-Victor Gilliéron and his wife Méry (née Ganty). Jean-Victor had left a post as a primary-school teacher in the villages of Lutry and Aubonne in 1853, becoming a French-language teacher in the Progymnasium in La Neuveville. He taught in the Gymnasium for girls in Basel from 1866, and was also a respected amateur geologist and palaeontologist. (Note: Greppin 1889–1890, pp. 234–235; Mitsopoulou 2021, pp. 35–36; Mitsopoulou 2024, pp. 53–54.) Jules's elder brother Émile, born in 1850, was an artist and archaeological draughtsman; another elder brother died in infancy. As children, the Gilliéron boys, including Jules, took part in Jean-Victor's geological expeditions.

Jules attended school in Neuchâtel, where his teachers included the dialectologist Cyprien Ayer. In 1874–1875, he accompanied his eldest brother, Alfred, on a tour of the Eastern Mediterranean region, which spanned several months. He took his school leaving exams in the autumn of 1875: these were graded "satisfactory", in response to which Gilliéron wrote to the school's governing body, with his father's support, to refuse his diploma, on the grounds that it had been given to him "out of kindness" and judged inferior to those awarded before. In the winter of the same year, he enrolled at the University of Basel, where he attended lectures by the historian Jacob Burckhardt, the linguist Jules Cornu, and the classical philologist and philosopher Friedrich Nietzsche. (Note: According to Mario Roques, later Gilliéron's collaborator, he was enthused by Burckhardt's lectures, and "much less so" by those of Nietzsche.)

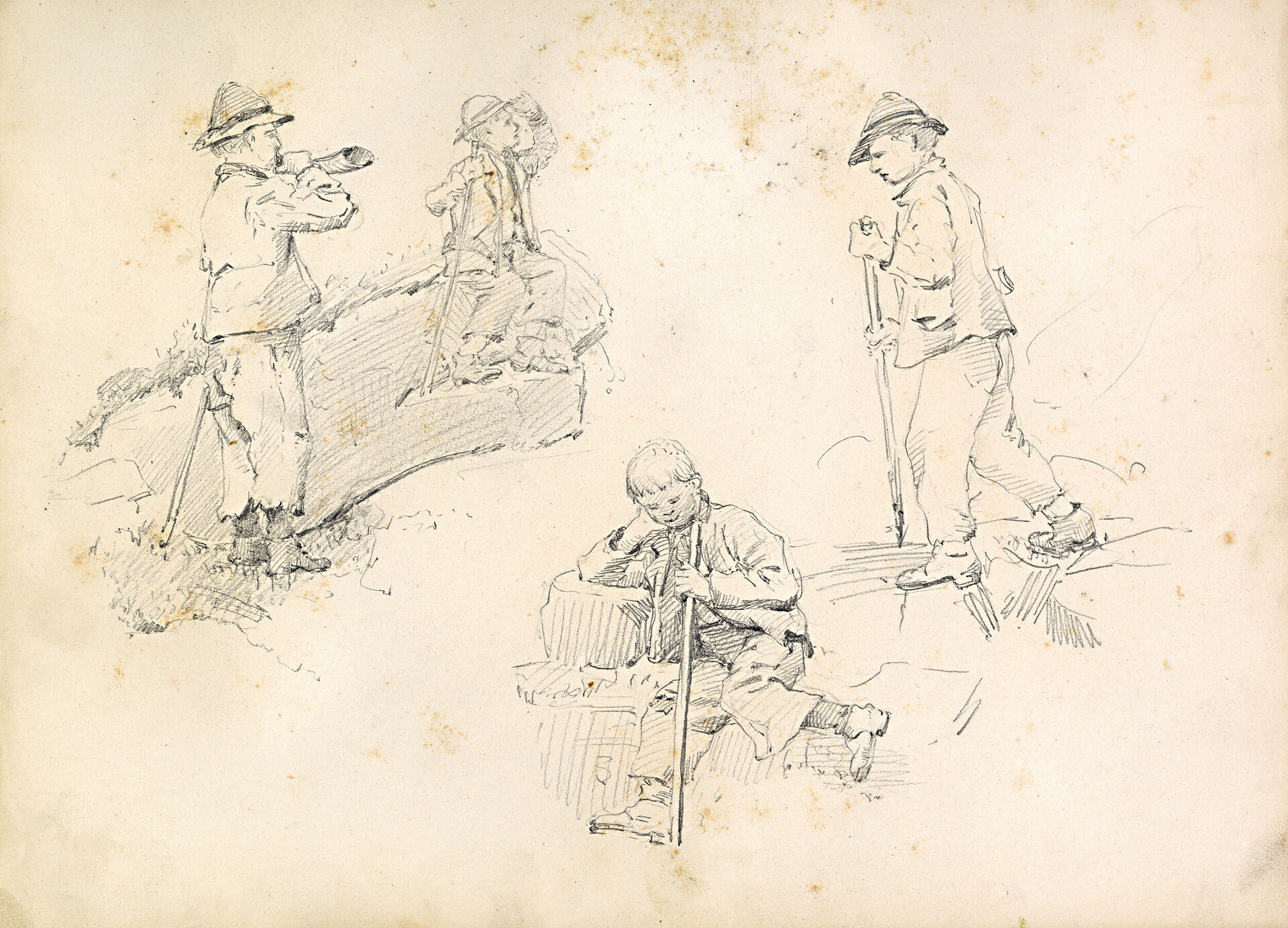
A sketch of his family made by Gilliéron's brother Émile as a child: Jules is at the far right. His father, Jean-Victor, is on the left.

Cornu advised Gilliéron to study under the linguists Paul Meyer, based in the French city of Chartres, and Gaston Paris, a lecturer at École pratique des Hautes Études in Paris who had developed Meyer's theories that dialects were not monolithic and that linguistic geography should therefore concentrate on individual linguistic features rather than dialect groups. In 1876, at the age of 22, Gilliéron moved permanently to Paris, where he attended from November lectures at the École pratique by Gaston Paris; by Michel Bréal, a prominent philologist of Ancient Greek; by the linguist Arsène Darmesteter; and by the classical philologist Louis Havet. He also attended lectures by Meyer in Chartres. During his first academic year in Paris, he delivered a lecture at a conference organised by Havet on the pronunciation of Vulgar Latin. After the 1876–1877 academic year, he studied primarily under Gaston Paris. In 1878, he began teaching German at the Lycée Chaptal, a secondary school. There, he taught advanced classes for students aspiring to study at the prestigious École polytechnique or at the Saint-Cyr military academy, using a version of the direct method he developed himself. During his time at the Lycée Chaptal, he also worked as a substitute professor at the University of Paris. His salary rose from 800 francs in 1878 to 4,950 in 1891. In 1897, he resigned his teaching post to focus his work on the Atlas linguistique de la France ('Linguistic Atlas of France'; ALF).

In January 1883, Gilliéron was appointed to the École pratique, succeeding Darmesteter as a lecturer in linguistics under Gaston Paris. At the suggestion of Bréal, who had supported his elevation to the post, he lectured on dialectology. His lectures initially covered Old French and the study of the living dialects of France. He became a French citizen in 1886, though continued to describe himself as Swiss, and to take holidays at a small property in Switzerland. He was made an Officier d'Academie, a member of the honorific Ordre des Palmes académiques, in 1891. From the 1892–1893 academic year, a new section of the École pratique for the study of the dialectology of Roman Gaul was created, separate from that (directed by Gaston Paris) dedicated to Romance linguistics: Gilliéron was placed in charge of it, with the title of deputy director. In 1894, he took the post of "Professor of Dialectology of Roman Gaul", at the École pratique, created for him by Gaston Paris. By 1913 he was assistant director of the École pratique, though his former student Iorgu Iordan later wrote that his salary at this point left him with barely enough to live on. In the same year, he was awarded the Légion d'honneur. By 1917, he was promoted to the rank of director of studies, the same title as Gaston Paris had held in the 1890s.

In later life, Gilliéron married a Mme. Geissbühler. During this period, he was affected by ill-health: Roques wrote of it as "an incurable disease which was fortunately kept hidden from him until the end". He was instructed by the secretary of the École pratique to take convalescent leave in the spring of 1926. He returned to Switzerland, where he died on 26 April in Schernelz. He remained in post at the École pratique until his death.

=== Students ===
Gilliéron's university courses were well known and attended by many future linguists. In total, 68 of his students have been identified as French, in comparison with 59 Swiss, 29 Germans, and smaller numbers from various other European countries, the United States, and Canada. A minority were women: these included Nellie Nicolet, who published a 1929 study of the dialect of the Italian Valle Antrona; (Note: The book is Nicolet 1929.) the Belgian philologist and translator Julia Bastin; the Russian Xenia Pamfilova; the Danish Rosally Brøndal, who along with her husband Viggo attended Gilliéron's lectures and became a founding member of the Linguistic Circle of Copenhagen; (Note: Pop & Pop 1959, p. 59. For the couple's involvement in the Linguistic Circle of Copenhagen, see "About the Linguistic Circle of Copenhagen". University of Copenhagen. 25 November 2012.) and the Welsh educationalist Gwladys Perrie Williams.

Gilliéron's earliest students, in 1882–1883, included the Swiss Ernest Muret, later a professor at Geneva and expert on the Romance place-names of Switzerland, and the Romanian Ioan Bianu, later a prominent bibliographer and director of the library of the Romanian Academy. The following year, he taught Eugen Braunholtz, later a lecturer at Cambridge. Between 1897 and 1900, he taught Albert Dauzat, later director of studies at the École pratique. The lexicographer Oscar Bloch followed Gilliéron's lectures each year between 1901 and 1905, as did Louis Adolphe Terracher, later Bloch's collaborator and a university administrator, between 1903 and 1907. Another long-serving French student was Charles Bruneau, who attended Gilliéron's lectures from 1908 until 1913. The Istrian-born Italian linguist Matteo Bartoli studied under Gilliéron prior to the publication of his series on the dialects of the Dalmatian language in 1906.

Among Gilliéron's Swiss students to become prominent in linguistics were Arthur Piaget, Jules Jeanjaquet, Ernst Tappolet (who attended his courses first in 1892–1893, then again in 1910–1911), Karl Jaberg, Johann Ulrich Hubschmied, Jakob Jud, Walther von Wartburg, Paul Aebischer and Reto Raduolf Bezzola. He taught at least ten Romanian students in total, including the linguist and diplomat Iorgu Iordan, who followed his lectures in the 1924–1925 academic year, and Alexandru Rosetti, later a professor of the University of Bucharest, who studied under Gilliéron between 1921 and 1926.

== Linguistic work ==
Gilliéron took up the study of the Franco-Provençal dialect of Vionnaz in the Roman Valais region of Switzerland in 1877, using it for his diploma thesis at the École pratique; he presented the thesis successfully on 20 April 1879. He published his results in 1880 as Patois de la commune de Vionnaz (Bas-Valais) ('Patois of the Town of Vionnaz (Bas-Valais)'). The following year, he expanded the project into a phonetic atlas of the whole Roman Valais region. This atlas, the Petit Atlas phonétique de Valais roman ('Little Phonetic Atlas of Roman Valais'), was an early example of the use of a pre-prepared questionnaire and direct fieldwork to conduct linguistic research, and the first phonetic atlas to be published on a Romance-speaking area.

In 1884, Gilliéron was approached by the Minister of Public Instruction to study the dialects of the langues d'oïl in southern Normandy. In 1887, he co-founded the Revue des patois gallo-romans ('Journal of Gallo-Romance Dialects'). His co-founder, Jean-Pierre Rousselot, had attended his lectures from 1885 until 1887. The journal was sponsored by Meyer and Gaston Paris, and was published until 1893. The phonetic transcription system used by this journal became known as the Rousselot–Gilliéron alphabet.

=== The Atlas Linguistique de la France ===
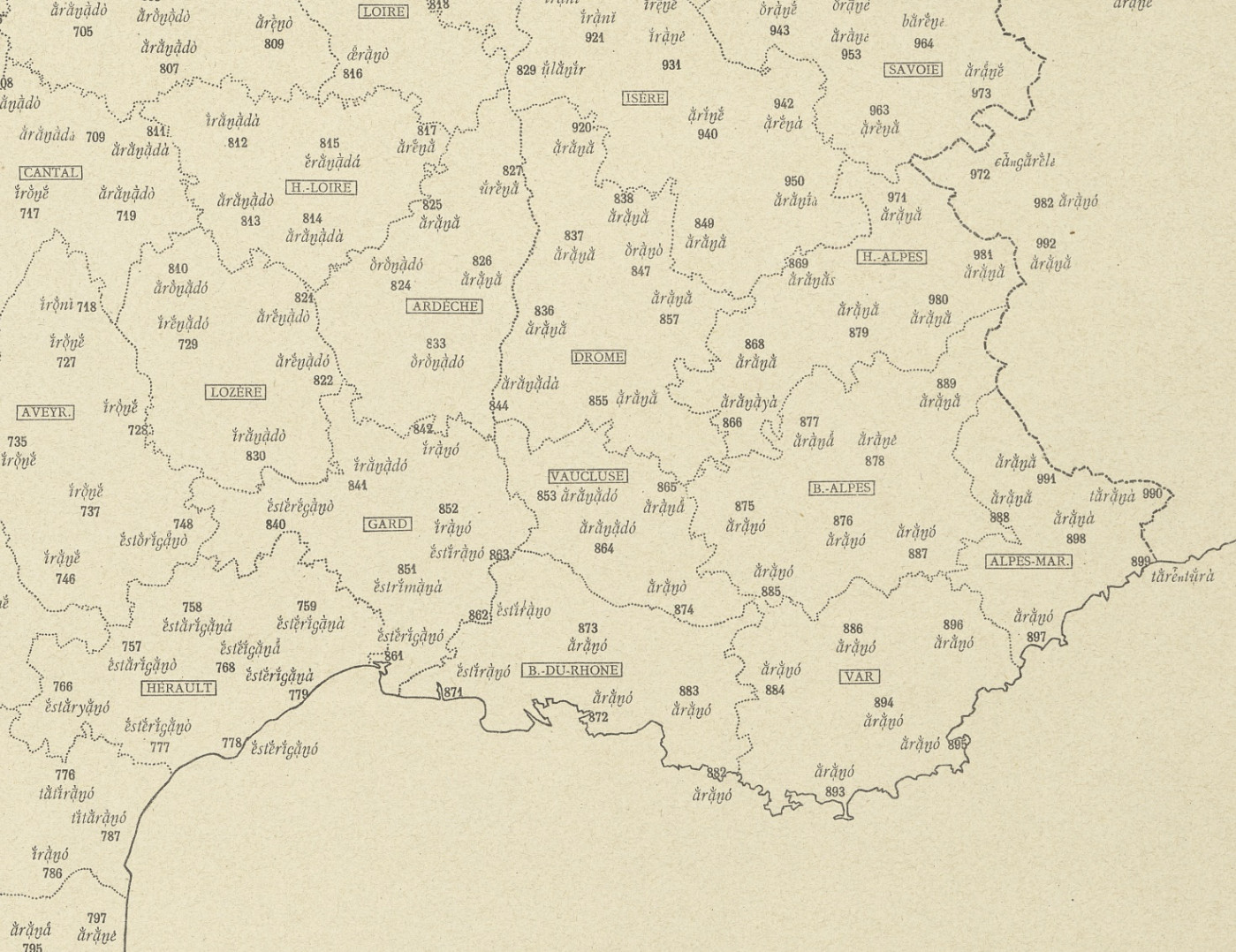
The southeast part of Map 50 of the ALF, showing dialect words for araignée ('spider')

With the encouragement of Gaston Paris, who secured funds towards the research and printing, (Note: Gilliéron wrote that Paris had secured support from the French government towards the project.) Gilliéron embarked upon the Atlas Linguistique de la France after his monograph on Roman Valais. The ALF was intended as a complete linguistic atlas of the Gallo-Romance area, which included France, French-speaking Switzerland, Wallonia, western Piedmont and the Channel Islands. It was the first major linguistic atlas of a Romance language, and the first national linguistic atlas to be completed. (Note: A German counterpart had been begun earlier.) Gilliéron tasked Edmond Edmont, a layman with highly sensitive hearing, (Note: Walter and Penhallurick state that he was a pharmacist, Glessgen that he was a cheese merchant. Penhallurick adds "shopkeeper" as a second occupation.) to travel by bicycle throughout rural areas between 1896 and 1900, (Note: Dash 2005, p. 22; Walter 2003, p. 95 (for Edmont's mode of transport).) using a questionnaire which focused on several different phonological, lexical and semantic marks of distinction. Edmont asked questions in standard French, asking respondents to translate words or phrases into their local dialects.

The methodology of the ALF was predicated upon Gilliéron's twofold belief that the Gallo-Romance area could be analysed according to mechanistic dialectological laws, and that this could be done by interviewing speakers fluent in both a local dialect and Standard French, who would be able to identify and produce the dialect form of a given Standard French word. Gilliéron periodically updated the questionnaire, which initially tested 1,421 items but grew over three series to 1,920, each represented in its own map. He required Edmont to record only the first answer given by each interviewee so as to preserve, as far as possible, the respondents' basilectal response. Edmont conducted interviews in 638 different locations, (Note: The atlas lists 639, but one village is counted twice.) using a single interviewee for each site, (Note: Gilliéron was critical of alternative approaches which allowed respondents to give several answers to a question, on the grounds that they made it more difficult to compare data from different sites: he called compilations formed by this method "dictionary-cemeteries".) writing down the responses he received in the Rousselot–Gilliéron alphabet, and sending them to Gilliéron at the end of each day. These methodological innovations ensured the quality and commensurability of the data collected in the ALF. Gilliéron's method of using a trained, professional data collector, rather than volunteers from the dialect communities, became the norm in dialectology.

The ALF was published in thirteen volumes between 1902 and 1910. Although it received limited scholarly attention in France, it was popular among scholars in Germany, Switzerland, Austria and Scandinavia, many of whom were Gilliéron's former students. Gilliéron received the prize of the Diez Foundation in 1908 for the work. Hans Goebl, in 2016, credited the ALF with founding the modern study of areal linguistics (the field aiming to chart and explain geographic differences of language). Following Gaston Paris's theories, Gilliéron focused his analysis of the ALF's data on individual linguistic features, rather than attempting to impose a typology or dialectal labels upon them. Karl Jaberg and Jakob Jud, who both studied under Gilliéron, later collaborated on the Sprach- und Sachatlas Italiens und der Südschweiz ('Linguistic and Ethnographic Atlas of Italy and Southern Switzerland'), published in eight volumes between 1928 and 1940, which applied his methods but refined them by including urban areas and asking respondents to name concepts without first offering a standard form of the word in question.

=== Views on linguistics and language change ===
Gilliéron's approach to etymology, in contrast to that of previous generations of scholars, emphasised the whole history of words rather than focusing entirely on their origins. In 1919, he compared an etymology focusing only on words' origins with a biography of Honoré de Balzac that read in its entirety: "Balzac, sitting on his nanny's knees, was dressed in a blue-and-red striped gown. He wrote La Comédie humaine." (Note: Gilliéron 1919, p. 133, quoted in Buchi 2015, p. 345.) Gilliéron's 1918 book, Généalogie des mots qui désignent l'abeille ('Genealogy of the Words Which Designate the Bee'), compared contemporary variants of a single word (abeille 'bee') to draw conclusions about linguistic change over time; it was the first attempt to do so systematically.

Gilliéron opposed the Neogrammarian school of linguistics, which taught that languages develop according to regular, exceptionless laws of sound change. He is often associated with the phrase "every word has its own history", and sometimes erroneously cited as its source. (Note: It was coined by Gilliéron's contemporary Hugo Schuchardt.) His work was in the early tradition of lexical diffusion, which sees sound changes as spreading word-by-word according to their frequency of use, against the prevailing Neogrammarian view which cast sound changes as mechanical events applied uniformly in particular phonotactic conditions. Unlike the Neogrammarians, he argued that human psychology plays a prominent role in linguistic change, and that various factors can result in sound changes spreading in a non-uniform fashion. The etymologist Christos Nifadopoulos names him, alongside Hugo Schuchardt, as one of the most important opponents of the Neogrammarian movement.

Gilliéron viewed language as a social tool, and believed that speakers could only differentiate concepts for which they had discrete linguistic forms. He therefore viewed the reduction of lexemes in a language – caused by sound change, the convergence of linguistic forms via folk etymology, and the simplification of multi-word signifiers into single words (Note: For instance, the abbreviation of vin de Champagne ('wine of Champagne') to champagne, or mouche d'essaim ('swarm-fly') into essaim (a dialectal word for 'bee').) – as a "pathological" situation which required correction. He considered that speakers use "therapies", continuing his medical metaphor, including the repurposing of existing dialect words to break a state of one word holding multiple meanings, the creation of completely new vocabulary for the same purpose, the borrowing of words from neighbouring dialects or the literary language; in the literary language itself, he further suggested that speakers may assimilate the spoken form of words to their written forms, which are often more distinct in French, or return to Latinate roots. At the time and since, other linguists judged that Gilliéron overstated the impact of homonymy, and that it harms communication only in limited circumstances. (Note: For example, when the two words are both of the same part of speech, grammatically interchangeable, and related in meaning, as Gilliéron argued for the merger of Latin gallus ('cockerel') and gattus ('cat') into dialect French gat.)

== Assessment ==
In 1954, Gino Bottiglioni called Gilliéron "the master of linguistic geography"; Mitja Skubic, in 2004, called him one of the most important Romance linguists of the early twentieth century. W. H. Veith, in 2006, called him the founder of scientific dialectology in France. Jürgen Lang writes that Gilliéron's prose can often be awkwardly expressed or difficult to interpret, as Gilliéron acknowledged, and that he often sought co-writers to mitigate this; in Lang's view, Gilliéron's sole-authored prose is often polemical and difficult to read. He echoes a contemporary criticism, raised by Georges Millardet in 1923, that Gilliéron wrote negatively of Neogrammarian linguists while generally adopting their position that sound change is regular. (Note: Lang 1982, p. 102. For Millardet's criticism and its date, see Swiggers 2024.) However, Lang praises his work with Jean Mongin (his co-author for a 1905 study of variants of scier 'to saw') for problematising the distinction between borrowed and inherited vocabulary, and that between the historical and geographic origins of a word.

In 2002, the publication of a 1998 conference on his work included the comment that Gilliéron had been comparatively overlooked in histories of linguistics, and that few studies to that date had concentrated in depth upon his work. The same study noted and challenged the view that Gilliéron merely collected linguistic facts without theoretical underpinning, suggesting that his work engaged with fundamental problems of language diversification, the role of speakers in the history of languages, and the proper methods of linguistic geography.

In an obituary, Iordan described Gilliéron as a modest man, who would have bristled to be referred to as a "scholar", who "worshipped no-one, admired no-one, and flattered no-one", and "in [whose] giant body there was hidden a soul with the naïveté of a child ... which made him extremely likeable." Another former student, Oscar Bloch, recalled Gilliéron's "two-hour, impassioned lectures", after which he would take his favourite students to Le Balzar, a brasserie, to drink beer. (Note: Quoted in Lauwers, Simoni-Aurembou & Swiggers 2002, p. 3.)

== Published works ==
- Gilliéron, Jules (1880). Patois de la commune de Vionnaz (Bas-Valais) [Patois of the Town of Vionnaz (Bas-Valais)]. Paris: F. Vieweg.
- — (1881). Petit Atlas phonétique de Valais roman [Little Phonetic Atlas of Roman Valais]. Paris: H. Champion.
- — (1885). Romania: table analytique des dix premiers volumes (1872–1881) [Romania: Analytical Table of the First Ten Volumes (1872–1881)]. Paris: Vieweg.
- —; Mongin, Jean (1905). Scier dans la Gaule romane du sud et de l'est ['To Saw' in Southern and Eastern Roman Gaul]. Paris: H. Champion.
- — (1912). l'aire « clavellus » [The "Clavellus" Area]. Neuveville: Beerstecher.
- — (1919). La faillite de l'étymologie phonétique: résumé de conférences faites à l'École pratique des hautes études [The Failure of Phonetic Etymology: Summary of Lectures Given at the École pratique des hautes études]. Neuveville: Beerstecher.
- —; Edmont, Edmond (1902–1910). Atlas linguistique de la France [Linguistic Atlas of France]. Paris: E. Champion.
- — (1918). Généalogie des mots qui désignent l'abeille d'après l'Atlas Linguistique de la France [Genealogy of the Words Which Mean "Bee", According to the Linguistic Atlas of France]. Paris: E. Champion.
- — (1921). Pathologie et thérapeutique verbales [Verbal Pathology and Therapy]. Paris: E. Champion.
- — (1922). Les étymologies des étymologistes et celles du peuple [The Etymologies of Etymologists and Those of the People]. Paris: E. Champion.
- — (1922). Ménagiana du XX^{e} siècle [Menagerie of the 20th Century]. Paris: E. Champion.
- — (1923). Thaumaturgie linguistique [Linguistic Thaumaturgy]. Paris: E. Champion.

== Works cited ==
- Atwood, E. Bagby (2010). The Regional Vocabulay of Texas. Austin: University of Texas Press. ISBN 978-0-292-79218-0.
- Bottiglioni, Gino (1954). "Linguistic Geography: Achievements, Methods and Orientations". WORD. 10 (2–3): 375–387. doi:10.1080/00437956.1954.11659534.
- Branca-Rosoff, Sonia (1990). "De la culture de la vigne à la cueillette des fleurs des champs: Les noms de la langue dans la dialectologie française du XIXe siècle" [From the Cultivation of the Vine to the Gathering of Wildflowers: The Names of the Language in 19th-Century French Dialectology]. Langue Française (in French). 85 (85): 48–67. doi:10.3406/lfr.1990.6177. ISSN 0023-8368. JSTOR 41558438.
- Brun-Trigaud, Guylaine (2011). "First Dialectologists: Jules Gilliéron". Dialectologia (in French). 6: 113–116. ISSN 2013-2247.
- Buchi, Éva (2015). "Etymological Dictionaries". In Durkin, Philip (ed.). The Oxford Handbook of Lexicography. pp. 338–349. doi:10.1093/oxfordhb/9780199691630.013.20. ISBN 978-0-19-969163-0.
- Campbell, Lyle (2017). "The History of Linguistics: Approaches to Linguistics" (PDF). In Aronoff, Mark; Rees-Miller, Janie (eds.). The Handbook of Linguistics. Oxford: Blackwell. pp. 95–117. ISBN 978-1-4051-8676-6.
- Chaurand, Jacques (1972). Introduction à la dialectologie française [Introduction to French Dialectology] (in French). France: Bordas. OCLC 299876471.
- Chaurand, Jacques (2002). "L'étymologie selon Gilliéron" [Etymology According to Gilliéron]. In Lauwers, Peter; Simoni-Aurembou, Marie-Rose; Swiggers, Pierre (eds.). Géographie linguistique et biologie du langage autour de Jules Gilliéron [Linguistic Geography and Biology of Language Around Jules Gilliéron]. Orbis Supplementa (in French). Leuven: Peeters. pp. 149–165. ISBN 90-429-1239-1.
- Dash, Niladri Sekhar (2005). Corpus Linguistics and Language Technology: With Reference to Indian Languages. New Delhi: Mittal Publications. ISBN 81-8324-033-X.
- Davis, Laurence M. (1971). "Worksheets and Their Variants". American Speech. 46 (1/2): 27–33. doi:10.2307/3087983. ISSN 0003-1283. JSTOR 3087983.
- De Mauro, Tullio (2009) [1996]. "Bartoli, Matteo Giulio". In Stammerjohann, Harro (ed.). Lexicon Grammaticorum: A Bio-Bibliographical Companion to the History of Linguistics. Vol. I: A–K (Second ed.). Tübingen: Max Niemeyer Verlag. pp. 104–105. doi:10.1515/9783484971127. ISBN 978-3-484-73068-7.
- Desmet, Piet; Lauwers, Peter; Swiggers, Pierre (2002). "Le développement de la dialectologie française avant et après Gilliéron" [The Development of French Dialectology Before and After Gilliéron]. In Lauwers, Peter; Simoni-Aurembou, Marie-Rose; Swiggers, Pierre (eds.). Géographie linguistique et biologie du langage autour de Jules Gilliéron [Linguistic Geography and Biology of Language Around Jules Gilliéron]. Orbis Supplementa (in French). Leuven: Peeters. pp. 17–64. ISBN 90-429-1239-1.
- Dworkin, Steven N. (1995). "Two Studies in Old Spanish Homonymics". Hispanic Review. 63 (4): 527–542. doi:10.2307/474740. ISSN 0018-2176. JSTOR 474740.
- Feodorov, Ioana (2023). Arabic Printing for the Christians in Ottoman Lands: The East-European Connection. Berlin: De Gruyter. doi:10.1515/9783110786996. ISBN 978-3-11-078699-6.
- Glessgen, Martin (2024). A New Companion to the Romance Languages. Leiden: Brill. doi:10.1515/9783111329338. ISBN 978-3-11-132933-8.
- Goebl, Hans (2013). "Le Baiser de la Belle au bois dormant ou : des péripéties encourues par la géographie linguistique depuis Jules Gilliéron" [Sleeping Beauty's Kiss: Or, The Adventures of Linguistic Geography Since Jules Gilliéron]. Corpus (in French). 12 (12): 61–84. doi:10.4000/corpus.2311. ISSN 1638-9808 – via Academia.edu.
- Goebl, Hans (2016). "Romance Linguistic Geography and Dialectometry". In Ledgeway, Adam; Maiden, Martin (eds.). The Oxford Guide to the Romance Languages. Oxford University Press. pp. 73–90. ISBN 978-0-19-967710-8.
- Goebl, Hans (2018). "Dialectometry". In Boberg, Charles; Watt, Dominic; Nerbonne, John (eds.). The Handbook of Dialectology. Chichester: Wiley. pp. 123–142. doi:10.1002/9781118827628. ISBN 978-1-118-82755-0.
- Greppin, Edouard (1889–1890). "Victor Gilliéron". Verhandlungen der Schweizerischen Naturforschenden Gesellschaft. 73: 234–238.
- Iordan, Iorgu; Orr, John (1970) [1937]. An Introduction to Romance Linguistics, Its Schools and Scholars. Revised by Rebecca Posner. Berkeley and Los Angeles: University of California Press. ISBN 0-520-01768-4.
- Iordan, Iorgu (1926). "† Jules Gillieron". Arhiva Societății Științifice și Literare din Iași (in Romanian). 33 (3–4): 223–225. ISSN 3100-6523.
- Kawaguchi, Makoto; Viereck, Wolfgang; Minigishi, Yuji (2011). "Introduction". In Kawaguchi, Makoto; Viereck, Wolfgang; Minigishi, Yuji (eds.). Corpus-based Analysis and Diachronic Linguistics. Amsterdam and Philadelphia: John Benjamins Publishing Company. pp. 7–20. ISBN 978-90-272-0770-8.
- Lang, Jürgen (1982). Sprache im Raum: Zu den theoretischen Grundlagen der Mundartforschung, unter Berücksichtigung des Rätoromanischen und Leonesischen [Language in Space: On the Theoretical Foundations of Dialect Research, with Reference to Romansh and Leonese]. Beihefte zur Zeitschrift für romanische Philologie (in German). Vol. 185. Leiden: Brill. doi:10.1515/9783111329031. ISBN 91-7916-026-3.
- Lauwers, Peter; Simoni-Aurembou, Marie-Rose; Swiggers, Pierre (2002). "Géographie linguistique et biologie du langage: l'apport de Jules Gilliéron" [Linguistic Geography and Biology of Language: The Contribution of Jules Gilliéron]. In Lauwers, Peter; Simoni-Aurembou, Marie-Rose; Swiggers, Pierre (eds.). Géographie linguistique et biologie du langage autour de Jules Gilliéron [Linguistic Geography and Biology of Language Around Jules Gilliéron]. Orbis Supplementa (in French). Leuven: Peeters. pp. 1–15. ISBN 90-429-1239-1.
- Mitsopoulou, Christina (2021). "Der Künstler Émile Gilliéron und seine Werke: Zur Vermittlung archäologischer Forschungsergebnisse an den Beispielen der Aquarellkopien aus Pompeji, Herculaneum, und Demetrias". In Lehmann, Stephan (ed.). Die Aquarellkopien antiker Wand- und Marmorbilder im Archäologischen Museum von Émile Gilliéron u. a. Kataloge und Schriften des archäologischen Museums der Martin-Luther-Universität (in German). Dresden: Sandstein Verlag. pp. 33–65. ISBN 978-2-7541-1383-0.
- Mitsopoulou, Christina (2024). "Gilliéron et son entourage" [Gilliéron and his entourage]. In Mitsopoulou, Christina; Farnoux, Alexandre; Jeammet, Violaine (eds.). L'Olympisme: Une invention moderne, un héritage antique [Olympianism: A Modern Invention, an Ancient Heritage] (in French). Paris: Hazan. pp. 52–61. ISBN 9782754113830.
- Nicolet, Nellie (1929). Der Dialekt des Antronatales: Lautlehre, Formenlehre, Texte, Glossar [The Dialect of the Antrona Valley: Phonology, Morphology, Texts, Glossary] (in German). Halle (Saale): Niemeyer. OCLC 1072584938.
- Nifadopoulos, Christos G. (2005). "History of Linguistics: Overview". In Strazny, Philipp (ed.). Encyclopedia of Linguistics. Vol. 1. Oxford and New York: Fitzroy Dearborn. pp. 463–467. ISBN 1-57958-450-0.
- Owczarek, Valentin; Drapeau, Jordan; Burie, Jean-Christophe; Franco, Patrick; Coustaty, Michaël; Mullot, Rémy; Eglin, Véronique (2020). "Classification of Phonetic Characters by Space-Filling Curves". In Lopresti, Daniel; Karatzas, Dimosthenis; Xiang, Bai (eds.). Document Analysis Systems: 14th IAPR International Workshop, DAS 2020, Wuhan, China, July 26–29, 2020, Proceedings. Cham: Springer International. pp. 89–100.
- Pedroni, Matteo (13 October 2004). "Gilliéron, Jules". Dictionnaire historique de la Suisse (in French).
- Penhallurick, Rob (2018). Studying Dialect. London: Bloomsbury. ISBN 978-1-350-30811-4.
- Phillips, Betty S. (2006). Word Frequency and Lexical Diffusion. Palgrave Studies in Language History and Language Change. Houndmills: Palgrave MacMillan. doi:10.1057/9780230286610. ISBN 978-0-230-28661-0.
- Pop, Sever; Pop, Rodica Doina (1959). Jules Gilliéron: vie, enseignement, élèves, oeuvres, souvenirs [Jules Gilliéron: Life, Teaching, Students, Works, Memories]. Louvain: Peeters. OCLC 23408907.
- Roques, Mario (1926). "Jules Gilliéron". Annuaires de l'École pratique des hautes études: 3–22. ISSN 1969-6310.
- Skubic, Mitja (2004). "Review: Géographie Linguistique et Biologie du Langage: Autour de Jules Gilliéron". Linguistica (in French). 44 (1): 167–171. doi:10.4312/linguistica.44.1.167-171. ISSN 0024-3922.
- Spitzer, Leo (1926). "Jules Gilliéron". Zeitschrift für französische Sprache und Literatur (in German). 48 (7/8): 506–511. ISSN 0044-2747. JSTOR 40614912.
- Swiggers, Pierre (21 August 2024). "The Contribution of Romance Linguistics to the Development of Structuralism". Oxford Encyclopedia of Romance Linguistics. Oxford Reference. doi:10.1093/acrefore/9780199384655.013.702. ISBN 978-0-19-938465-5.
- Szabó, Gergely; Fazakas, Noémi; Kocsis, Zsuzsanna; Krizsai, Fruzsina; Vargha, Fruzsina S. (2025). "Researching Dialects with High School Students: A Citizen Science Approach". Linguistics Vanguard. 11: 447–458. doi:10.1515/lingvan-2024-0189. ISSN 2199-174X.
- Veith, W. H. (2006). "Gilliéron, Jules (1854–1926)". In Brown, E. K. (ed.). The Encyclopedia of Language and Linguistics. Vol. Gen–Int (2nd ed.). Elsevier. ISBN 978-0-08-054784-8.
- Walter, Henriette (2003). French Inside Out: The Worldwide Development of the French Language in the Past, the Present and the Future. New York: Taylor and Francis. ISBN 1-134-90205-0.
