= Honoré Champion =

French publisher

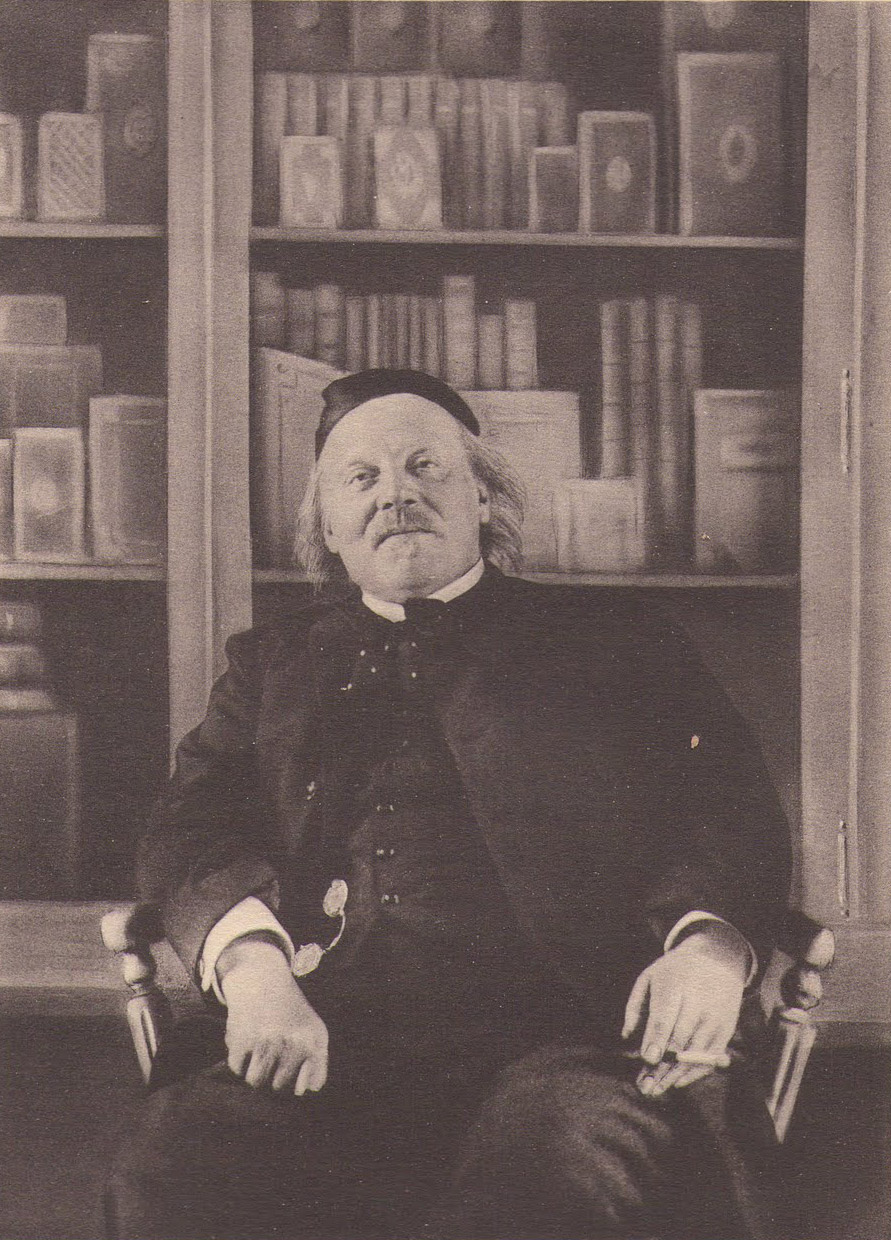
Honoré Champion

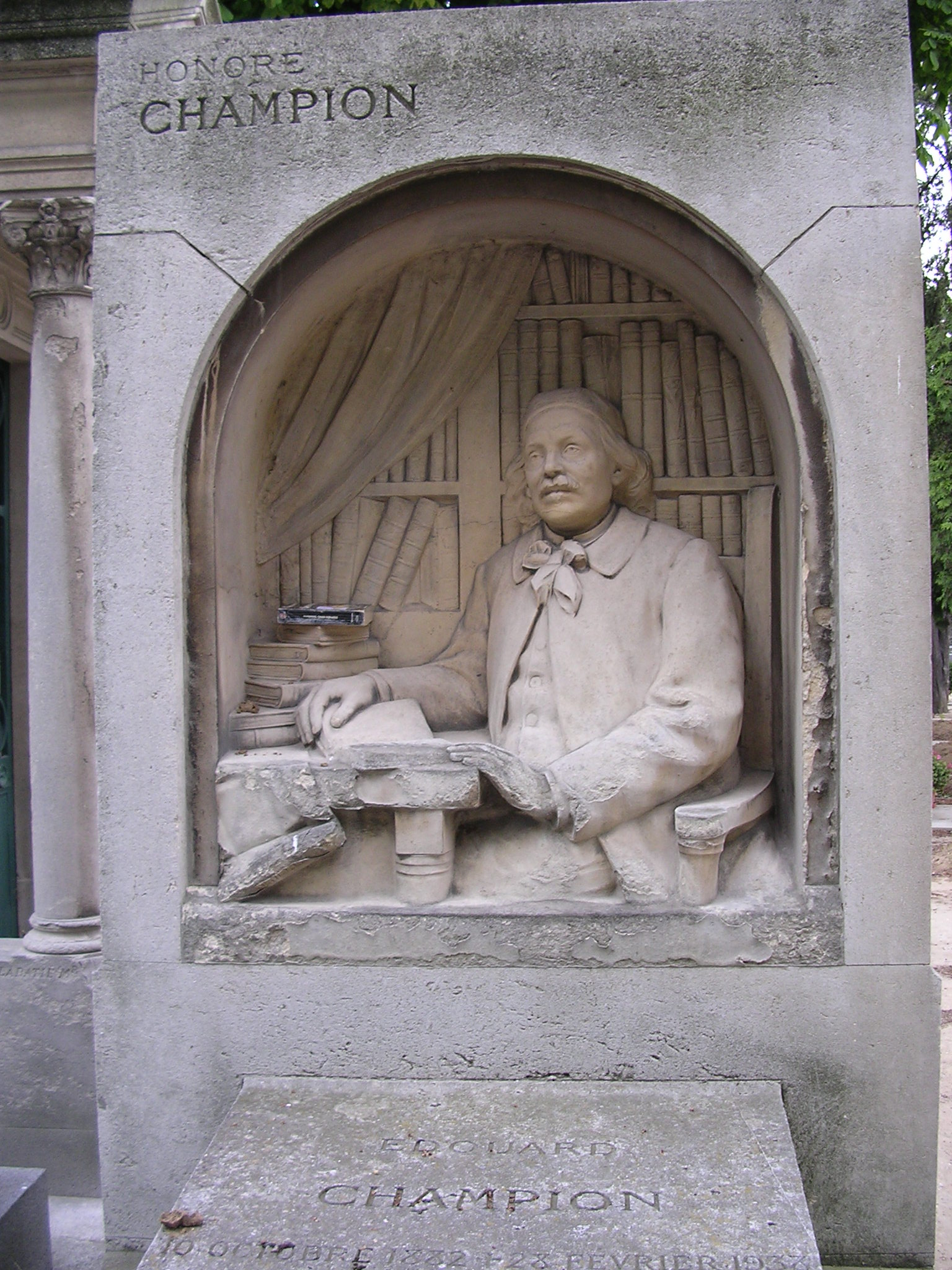
Tomb of Honoré Champion, by Albert Bartholomé

Honoré Champion (1846–1913) was a French publisher. He founded Éditions Honoré Champion in 1874 and published scientific works geared towards laymen, particularly concerning history and literature.

Champion died from an embolism on 8 April 1913 in his apartment at 30 rue Jacob, Paris. His tomb, located at the Montparnasse Cemetery, was sculpted by Albert Bartholomé.

His sons were Édouard Champion, who took over the bookstore and the publishing house (often rendered in colophons as H. Champion), and the historian Pierre Champion.
