= Albert Dauzat =

French linguist (1877–1955)

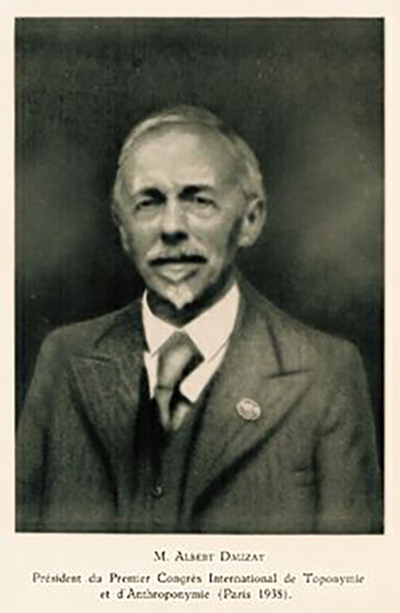
- Born: 4 July 1877; Guéret, France
- Died: 31 October 1955 (aged 78); 15th arrondissement of Paris, France
- Occupation: Linguist
- Writing career
- Language: French
- Notable works: Tableau de la langue française (1941); Grammaire raisonnée de la langue française (1947)

Albert Dauzat (French pronunciation: [albɛʁ doza]; 4 July 1877 – 31 October 1955) was a French linguist specializing in toponymy and onomastics.

Dauzat, a student of Jules Gilliéron, was a director of studies at the École des hautes études.

== Works ==
- L'argot des poilus; dictionnaire humoristique et philologique du langage des soldats de la grande guerre de 1914, 1918
- La géographie linguistique, 1922
- Les noms de lieux, origine et évolution; villes et villages--pays--cours d'eau--montagnes--lieux-dits, 1926
- La Langue Française: sa vie, son évolution, 1926
- Les argots : caractères, évolution, influence, 1928
- Le génie de la langue française, 1942
- Grammaire raisonnée de la langue française, 1947
- Dictionnaire étymologique des noms de famille et prénoms de France, 1951

== Bibliography ==
- Colloque Albert Dauzat et le patrimoine linguistique auvergnat, Thiers, 5-6-7 novembre 1998 : actes (colloque organisé par le parc naturel régional Livradois-Forez), coédition Parc naturel régional Livradois-Forez (Saint-Gervais-sous-Meymont), CNRS (Montpellier) et CRDP d’Auvergne (Clermont-Ferrand), 2000, 255, ISBN 2-86619-226-5, BnF 372130687. — Inclut une correspondance inédite d’Albert Dauzat à Henri Pourrat et à Karl Jaberg.
- Anne-Marguerite Fryba-Reber, Dauzat et Jaberg : deux héritiers de Gilliéron, in Actes du Colloque Dauzat et le patrimoine linguistique auvergnat, Montpellier, 2000, 211-230
- Joan Pèire Chambon (=Jean-Pierre Chambon), Albert Dauzat [H. Stammerjohann (1996) Lexicon grammaticorum. Who’s Who in the History of World Linguistics, Tübingen, p. 226]
