= Hubert Pernot =

French linguist

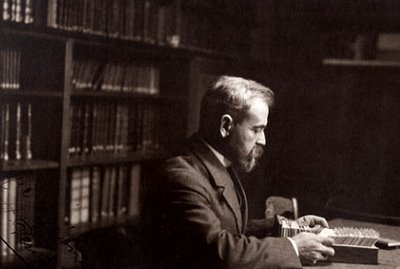
Hubert Pernot

Hubert Octave Pernot (French: [ybɛʁ pɛʁno]; 7 August 1870, Froideconche – 27 June 1946, Paris) was a French linguist, specializing in Modern Greek studies.

== Career ==
He studied at the École des langues orientales in Paris as a pupil of Émile Legrand and Jean Psichari, and from 1895 to 1912 worked as a répétiteur of Modern Greek at the school. In 1912 he became a lecturer at the University of Paris, where from 1930 he served as a professor of post-classical and Modern Greek and of neo-Hellenic literature.

In 1898–99 he made two trips to the island of Chios, from where he recorded music of traditional folk songs and dances, some of which were put to musical score by composer Paul Le Flem. In 1928–30 he made phonograph recordings of traditional folk songs in Romania, Czechoslovakia and Greece.

He was founder (1919) and director of the Institut néo-hellénique at the Sorbonne, and director of the Institut de Phonétique et des Archives de la parole (Institute of Phonetics and Speech Archives). He made contributions to Émile Legrand's Bibliographie hellénique, and with Jean-Pierre Rousselot, he was co-editor of the journal Revue de phonétique.

=== Fieldwork and phonograph recordings ===
In 1898 and 1899, at the instigation of Jean-Pierre Rousselot, Pernot conducted his first recordings of Greek language and musical traditions on the island of Chios using a small graphophone. These missions produced approximately 150 wax cylinders, of which 92 survive today, preserved at the Bibliothèque nationale de France and the International Archives of Popular Music at the Ethnography Museum of Geneva.

The Chios collection includes 114 melodies, four of which were transcribed and harmonized by composer Maurice Ravel. Paul Le Flem assisted Pernot in transcribing the folk songs, which were published as Mélodies populaires grecques de l'île de Chio recueillies au phonographe (1903). These recordings formed the basis of Pernot's doctoral thesis, Études de linguistique néo-hellénique. I. Phonétique des parlers de Chio (1907).

Pernot conducted three major fieldwork missions later in his career: to Romania in 1928 (recording 150 discs with over 500 folk tunes and dialect documents), to Czechoslovakia in 1929 (over 200 discs including folk songs, instrumental pieces, dialects, and political speeches), and to Greece in 1930 (over 200 discs documenting engagement songs, harvest songs, wedding songs, and regional traditions from Macedonia, Crete, and Cappadocia).

== Selected works ==
- Grammaire du grecque moderne, 1897 – Modern Greek grammar.
- Chrestomathie grecque moderne publiée (with Émile Legrand, 1899) – Modern Greek chrestomathy.
- Mélodies populaires greques de l'Ile de Chio recueillies au phonographe, 1903 – Popular Greek melodies of the island of Chios collected via the phonograph.
- Études de linguistique néo-hellénique, 1907 – Studies of neo-Hellenic linguistics.
- Grammaire et vocabulaire du grec vulgaire (with Girolamo Germano, 1907) – Grammar and vocabulary of common Greek.
- Anthologie populaire de la Grèce moderne, 1910 – Popular anthology of modern Greek
- Bibliographie ionienne; description raisonée des ouvrages pub. par les Grecs des Sept-Îles ou concernant ces îles du quinzième siècle à l'année 1900 (by Émile Legrand, posthumously edited and published by Pernot; 2 volumes, 1910) – Ionian bibliography, etc.
- Études de littérature grecque moderne, 1916 – Studies of modern Greek literature.
- Recueil de textes en grec usuel avec traduction franc̜aise, notes et remarques étymologiques, 1918 – Collection of texts in Greek, with French translation; etymological notes and remarks.
- La Grèce actuelle dans ses poètes, 1921 – Present-day Greece and its poets.
- Chansons populaires grecques des XVe et XVIe siècles, 1931 – Greek folk songs from the 15th and 16th centuries.
- Lexique grec moderne français, 1933 – French-Modern Greek lexicon
- Introduction à l'étude du dialecte tsakonien, 1934 – Introduction to the study of the Tsakonian dialect.
- Recherches sur le texte original des Évangiles, 1938 – Research on the original text of the Gospels.
