= Atlas linguistique de la France =

Pioneering dialect atlas of Romance varieties in France

- Map 1286 of the Atlas: word for 'mole' (Standard French taupe) at each site
- Author: Jules Gilliéron and Edmond Edmont
- Language: French
- Subject: Dialect geography
- Publisher: Édouard Champion
- Publication date: 1902–1910
- Publication place: France
- Media type: Print

The Atlas linguistique de la France (French pronunciation: [atlɑs lɛ̃ɡɥistik də la fʁɑ̃s], "Linguistic Atlas of France", ALF) is an influential dialect atlas of Romance varieties in France by Jules Gilliéron and Edmond Edmont. It was published in 13 volumes between 1902 and 1910 by Édouard Champion.

Whereas Georg Wenker had used postal questionnaires to compile his pioneering Sprachatlas des deutschen Reichs in 1888 on German dialects, Gilliéron employed a fieldworker, Edmond Edmont. Between 1896 and 1900, Edmont conducted 700 interviews at 639 locations throughout the countryside of France, southern Belgium, western Switzerland, the Channel Islands, and the Aosta Valley and the Occitan Valleys of Piedmont in Italy, using a questionnaire of over 1,500 items devised and continually revised by Gilliéron. The results were collated and analysed by Gilliéron and his assistants.

Gilliéron's survey stimulated interest in dialect geography, and became the model for later works elsewhere. Two of his students, Karl Jaberg and Jakob Jud, directed a survey of Italian dialects of Italy and southern Switzerland, published as the Sprach- und Sachatlas Italiens und der Südschweiz (1928–1940). Jud and one of his fieldworkers helped to train fieldworkers for the Linguistic Atlas of the United States and Canada project, which produced the Linguistic Atlas of New England (1939–1940), the Linguistic Atlas of the Upper Midwest (1973–1976) and the Linguistic Atlas of the Gulf States (1986–1992).
