= Eugen Braunholtz =

German-born British philologist and scholar

Eugen Gustav Wilhelm Braunholtz (21 January 1859, Goslar – 8 February 1941, Cambridge) was a German-born British philologist and scholar of French language and literature, known for his editorship of school editions of French classics.

== Biography ==
Braunholtz went to school in Hildesheim and Hanover and then studied in Tübingen (1878–1879) and Berlin (1879–1883). In 1883 he received from the Humboldt University of Berlin his doctorate (Promotion) with a dissertation on the origin and distribution of non-Christian tales that were forerunners to the Christian parable of Barlaam and Josaphat. He then studied at the University of Paris. At the University of Cambridge, he was from 1884 to 1900 a university lecturer in French and from 1900 to 1939 a reader in Romance languages. Braunholtz was awarded an MA Hon. causa in 1886 from King's College, Cambridge, where he was made a Fellow. For some years he was a sub-editor for the Modern Language Review.

He married and had issue. Braunholtz was the brother-in-law and colleague of Karl Hermann Breul (1860–1932), the first Germanist at the University of Cambridge. Both Braunholtz and Breul became academics at the University of Cambridge in 1884.

== Selected publications ==
- Die erste nichtchristliche Parabel des Barlaam und Josaphat. Ihre Herkunft und Verbreitung. Karras, Halle an der Saale 1884 (Dissertation)
- Books of reference for students & teachers of French. A critical survey. Hachette & Company, London 1901

== Sources ==
- Günther Schütz: Epistolario de Rufino José Cuervo with filólogos de Alemania, Austria y Suiza y noticias de las demás relaciones de Cuervo con estos países y sus representantes. vol. 1, Bogotá 1976, pp. 619–624
