= Raymond Herbert Stetson =

American speech scientist (died 1950)

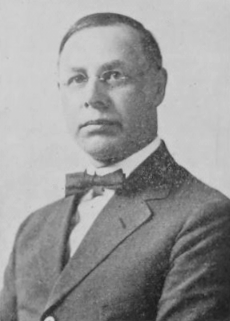
- Born: March 1, 1872; North Ridgeville, Ohio, US
- Died: December 4, 1950 (aged 78); Oberlin, Ohio, US
- Education: Oberlin College; Harvard University
- Occupation: Speech scientist

Raymond Herbert Stetson (March 1, 1872 – December 4, 1950) was an American speech scientist at Oberlin College. In 1928 he published an influential book called Motor Phonetics: A Study of Speech Movements in Action. He is the one who developed the chest pulses theory in the study of English syllables; the number of syllables is determined in the number of chest pulses.

== Biography ==
Raymond Herbert Stetson was born in North Ridgeville, Ohio on March 1, 1872. He graduated from Harvard University and Oberlin College.

He died in Oberlin, Ohio on December 4, 1950.
