= Jules Pouget =

French politician

- Born: 8 March 1884; Espalion, Aveyron, France
- Died: 30 July 1963 (aged 79); Paris, France
- Occupation: Politician

Jules Pouget (8 March 1884 - 30 July 1963) was a French politician. He served as a member of the French Senate from 1948 to 1952, representing Pas-de-Calais.
