= Karl Jaberg =

Swiss linguist and dialectologist

Karl Jaberg (4 April 1877, in Langenthal – 30 May 1958, in Bern) was a Swiss linguist and dialectologist.

He studied Romance philology at the University of Bern, and furthered his education in Paris (1900/01), where his influences included Gaston Paris, Ferdinand Brunot and Jules Gilliéron. From 1901 to 1906 he worked as a teacher at the cantonal school in Aarau. In 1906 he obtained his habilitation at the University of Zürich, and from 1907 to 1945, taught classes in Romance philology and Italian language and literature at the University of Bern. From 1942 to 1948 he was director of the Glossaire des patois de la Suisse romande.

== Selected writings ==
With Jakob Jud, he was co-author of the immense Sprach- und Sachatlas Italiens und der Südschweiz ("Linguistic and ethnographic atlas of Italy and southern Switzerland"; 8 volumes, 1928–40). Other written works by Jaberg include:

- Sprachgeographie, 1928 – Language geography.
- Sprachtradition und Sprachwandel, 1931 – Language tradition and language change.
- Aspects géographiques du langage : conférence faites au Collège de France, 1933 – Geographical aspects of language.
- Sprachwissenschaftliche Forschungen und Erlebnisse, 1937 – Linguistic research and experiences.
