= Georg Wenker =

German linguist (1852–1911)

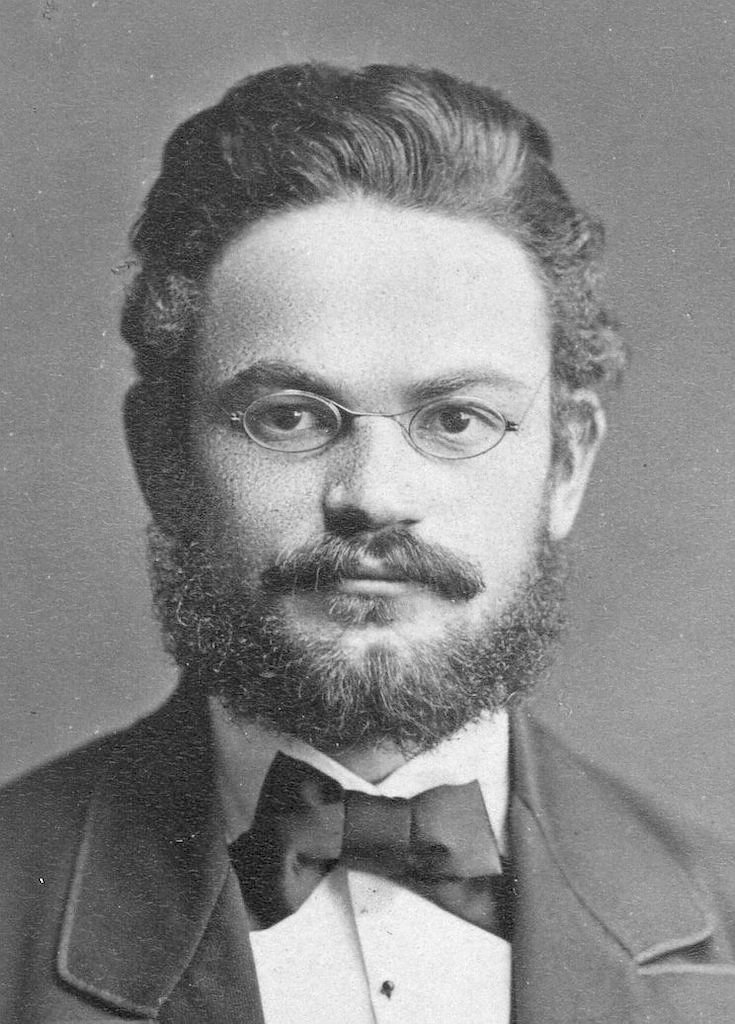
- Born: January 25, 1852
- Died: July 17, 1911 (aged 59)

Philosophical work
- Era: 19th-century philosophy
- Region: German philosophy
- Main interests: Dialectology

Georg Wenker (January 25, 1852 – July 17, 1911) was a German linguist who began documenting German dialect geography during the late nineteenth century. He is considered a pioneer in this field and contributed several groundbreaking publications, most notably, the Deutscher Sprachatlas.

== Biography ==
Georg Wenker was born in Düsseldorf on January 25, 1852. He attended gymnasium there and in 1872 received his eligibility to attend college. Beginning the summer semester of 1872, Wenker studied in Zürich, Bonn and Marburg. In 1876, Wenker earned his Ph.D. degree in Tübingen with a dissertation topic on the shifting of German root syllables. In 1877 he took on the position as a librarian at Königlichen Universität Marburg, where he later received an honorary professorship in 1898. In 1886, he was appointed honorary member of the Koninklijke vlaamsche Academie voor taal- en letterkunde. Eventually, the institution became nationalized in 1888 and Wenker became director. He died in 1911.

== Contributions and significance ==
Wenker's first effort to map spoken dialect began in 1876 and involved surveying schoolmasters in northern Germany. He sent a list of sentences written in standardized German and requested a transcription into the local dialect. From 1877 until 1887 Wenker successfully surveyed the entire country, and out of 50,000 surveys, 45,000 schoolmasters replied. Each questionnaire contained forty sentences, ranging from simple to somewhat difficult, and offered multiple points from which the local dialect could emerge. The first sentence, for example, was Im Winter fliegen die trocknen Blätter durch die Luft herum, In winter the dry leaves fly around through the air.

The immense size of the corpus Wenker had before him proved to be a disadvantage. He was therefore confined to analyzing the variation of only a small number of certain words and within a small area as well. Moreover, the difficulty in publishing maps also hindered access to his work. He made two sets of maps by hand and both were published under the title Sprachatlas des deutschen Reichs. The two maps each cover a single feature in north and central Germany.

Wenker continued collecting questionnaires after the publication of his atlas, but it took more than forty years for his vision to be realized. In 1926, under the editorship of Ferdinand Wrede, the first volume of the Deutscher Sprachatlas was published. Inevitably perhaps, later dialectologists found Wenker's data, which was rich in phonological and word-structure information, to be too limited in terms of lexical and syntactic variants.

The project was discontinued in 1956, but resulted in over 16,000 hand-drawn maps, which are currently housed in the atlas archives in Marburg. In spite of the problems experienced by Wenker, his pioneering work nonetheless set the foundation for many successors.

== Additional sources ==
- Chambers, J.K. and Peter Trudgill. 1980. Dialectology. Cambridge: Cambridge University Press.
- Petyt, K.M. 1980. The Study of Dialect. London: Andre Deutsch Limited.
