= Jakob Jud =

Swiss linguist (1882–1952)

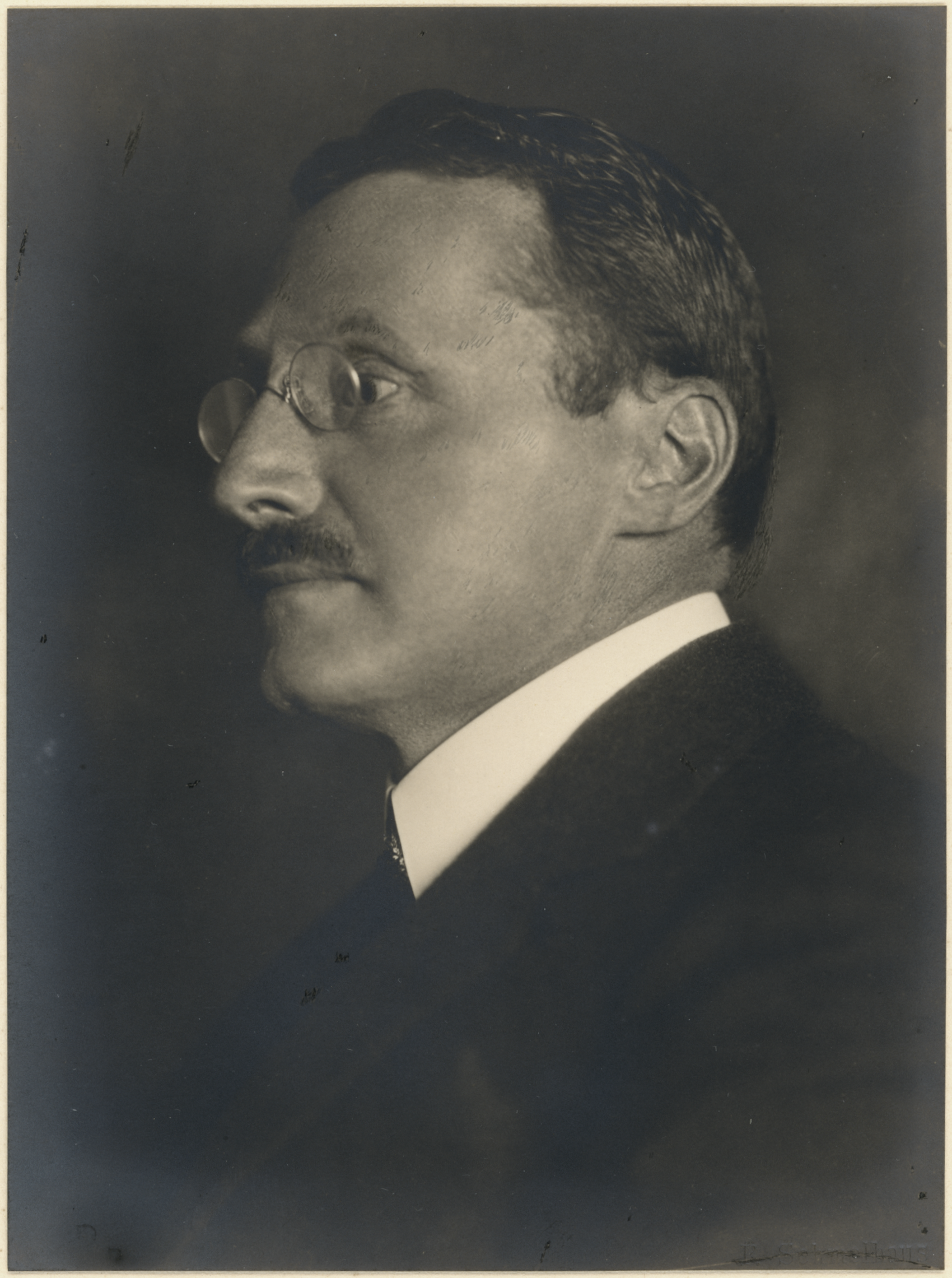
Jakob Jud

Jakob Jud (Swiss Standard German pronunciation: [ju:t]; 12 January 1882 in Wängi, Kanton Thurgau – 15 June 1952 in Seelisberg, Kanton Uri) was a Swiss Romance linguist (Romanist).

From 1922 to 1950 he taught classes in Romance philology and Old French literature at the University of Zürich. With Karl Jaberg, he was the author of Sprach- und Sachatlas Italiens und der Südschweiz (8 volumes, 1928–40). In 1936, with Arnald Steiger, he founded the magazine Vox Romanica.

He became a foreign member of the Royal Netherlands Academy of Arts and Sciences in 1946.
