= Heteronomous =

Heteronomous means 'having different laws' and is used in two contexts:

- Heteronomous annulation, an important character in arthropod evolution
- Heteronomous language, linguistic dialects

== See also ==
- Heteronomy
