= Standard language =

Language variety with substantially codified usage

A standard language (or standard variety, standard dialect, standardized dialect or simply standard) is any language variety that has undergone substantial codification in its grammar, lexicon, writing system, or other features and that stands out among related varieties in a community as the one with the highest status or prestige, particularly in formal public and academic contexts. Often, it is the prestige language variety of a whole country.

In linguistics, the process of a variety becoming organized into a standard, for instance by being widely expounded in grammar books or other reference works, and also the process of making people's language usage conform to that standard, is called standardization. Typically, the varieties that undergo standardization are those associated with centres of commerce and government, used frequently by educated people and in news broadcasting, and taught widely in schools and to non-native learners of the language. Within a language community, standardization usually begins with a particular variety being selected (often towards a goal of further linguistic uniformity), accepted by influential people, socially and culturally spread, established in opposition to competitor varieties, maintained, increasingly used in diverse contexts, and assigned a high social status as a result of the variety being linked to the most successful people. As a sociological effect of these processes, most users of a standard dialect—and many users of other dialects of the same language—come to believe that the standard is inherently superior to, or consider it the linguistic baseline against which to judge, the other dialects. However, such beliefs are firmly rooted in social perceptions rather than any objective evaluation. Any varieties that do not carry high social status in a community (and thus may be defined in opposition to standard dialects) are called nonstandard or vernacular dialects.

The standardization of a language is a continual process, because language is always changing and a language in use cannot be permanently standardized. Standardization may originate from a motivation to make the written form of a language more uniform, as is the case of Standard English. Typically, standardization processes include efforts to stabilize the spelling of the prestige dialect, to codify usages and particular (denotative) meanings through formal grammars and dictionaries, and to encourage public acceptance of the codifications as intrinsically correct. In that vein, a pluricentric language has interacting standard varieties. Examples are English, French, Portuguese, German, Korean, Serbo-Croatian, Spanish, Swedish, Armenian and Mandarin Chinese. Monocentric languages, such as Russian and Japanese, have one standardized idiom.

The term standard language occasionally refers also to the entirety of a language that includes a standardized form as one of its varieties. In Europe, a standardized written language is sometimes identified with the German word Schriftsprache (written language). The term literary language is occasionally used as a synonym for standard language, a naming convention still prevalent in the linguistic traditions of eastern Europe. In contemporary linguistic usage, the terms standard dialect and standard variety are neutral synonyms for the term standard language, usages which indicate that the standard language is one of many dialects and varieties of a language, rather than the totality of the language, whilst minimizing the negative implication of social subordination that the standard is the only form worthy of the label "language".

== Linguistic standardization ==
The term standard language identifies a repertoire of broadly recognizable conventions in spoken and written communications used in a society; the term implies neither a socially ideal idiom nor a culturally superior form of speech. These conventions develop from related dialects, usually by social action (ethnic and cultural unification) that elevate discourse patterns associated with perceived centres of culture, or more rarely, by deliberately defining the norms of standard language with selected linguistic features drawn from the existing dialects, as in the case of Modern Hebrew.

Either course of events typically results in a relatively fixed orthography codified in grammars and normative dictionaries, in which users can also sometimes find illustrative examples drawn from literary, legal, or religious texts. Whether grammars and dictionaries are created by the state or by private citizens (e.g. Webster's Dictionary), some users regard such linguistic codifications as authoritative for correcting the spoken and written forms of the language. Effects of such codifications include slowing the pace of diachronic change in the standardized variety and affording a basis for further linguistic development (Ausbau). In the practices of broadcasting and of official communications, the standard usually functions as a normalizing reference for speech and writing. In educational contexts, it usually informs the version of the language taught to non-native learners.

In those ways, the standard variety acquires social prestige and greater functional importance than nonstandard dialects, which depend upon or are heteronomous with respect to the standard idiom. Standard usage serves as the linguistic authority, as in the case of specialist terminology; moreover, the standardization of spoken forms is oriented towards the codified standard. Historically, a standard language arises in two ways: (i) in the case of Standard English, linguistic standardization occurs informally and piecemeal, without formal government intervention; (ii) in the cases of the French and Spanish languages, linguistic standardization occurs formally, directed by prescriptive language institutions, such as the Académie Française and the Royal Spanish Academy, which respectively produce Le bon français and El buen español.

A standard variety can be conceptualized in two ways: (i) as the sociolect of a given socio-economic stratum or (ii) as the normative codification of a dialect, an idealized abstraction. Hence, the full standardization of a language is impractical, because a standardized dialect cannot fully function as a real entity, but does function as set of linguistic norms observed to varying degrees in the course of usus – of how people actually speak and write the language. In practice, the language varieties identified as standard are neither uniform nor fully stabilized, especially in their spoken forms. From that perspective, the linguist Suzanne Romaine says that standard languages can be conceptually compared to the imagined communities of nation and nationalism, as described by the political scientist Benedict Anderson, which indicates that linguistic standardization is the result of a society's history and sociology, and thus is not a universal phenomenon; of the approximately 7,000 contemporary spoken languages, most do not have a codified standard dialect.

Politically, in the formation of a nation-state, identifying and cultivating a standard variety can serve efforts to establish a shared culture among the social and economic groups who compose the new nation-state. Different national standards, derived from a continuum of dialects, might be treated as discrete languages (along with heteronomous vernacular dialects) even if there are mutually intelligible varieties among them, such as the North Germanic languages of Scandinavia (Danish, Norwegian, and Swedish). Moreover, in political praxis, either a government or a neighbouring population might deny the cultural status of a standard language. In response to such political interference, linguists develop a standard variety from elements of the different dialects used by a society.

For example, when Norway became independent from Denmark in 1814, the only written language was Danish. Different Norwegian dialects were spoken in rural districts and provincial cities, but people with higher education and upper-class urban people spoke "Danish with a Norwegian pronunciation". Based upon the bourgeois speech of the capital Oslo (Christiania) and other major cities, several orthographic reforms, notably in 1907 and 1917, resulted in the official standard Riksmål, in 1929 renamed Bokmål ('book tongue'). The philologist Ivar Aasen (1813–1896) considered urban and upper-class Dano-Norwegian too similar to Danish, so he developed Landsmål ('country tongue'), the standard based upon the dialects of western Norway. In 1885 the Storting (parliament) declared both forms official and equal. In 1929 it was officially renamed Nynorsk (New Norwegian).

Likewise, in Yugoslavia (1945–1992), when the Socialist Republic of Macedonia (1963–1991) developed their national language from the dialect continuum demarcated by Serbia to the north and Bulgaria to the east, their Standard Macedonian was based upon vernaculars from the west of the republic, which were the dialects most linguistically different from standard Bulgarian, the previous linguistic norm used in that region of the Balkan peninsula. Although Macedonian functions as the standard language of the Republic of North Macedonia, nonetheless, for political and cultural reasons, Bulgarians treat Macedonian as a Bulgarian dialect.

== Examples ==
=== Chinese ===
Chinese consists of hundreds of local varieties, many of which are not mutually intelligible, usually classified into seven to ten major groups, including Mandarin, Wu, Yue, Hakka and Min. Before the 20th century, most Chinese spoke only their local variety. For two millennia, formal writing had been done in Classical Chinese, a style modelled on the classics and far removed from any contemporary speech. As a practical measure, officials of the late imperial dynasties carried out the administration of the empire using a common language based on Mandarin varieties, known as Guānhuà (literally "speech of officials").

In the early 20th century, many Chinese intellectuals argued that the country needed a standardized language. By the 1920s, Literary Chinese had been replaced as the written standard by written vernacular Chinese, which was based on Mandarin dialects. In the 1930s, Standard Chinese was adopted, with its pronunciation based on the Beijing dialect, but with vocabulary also drawn from other Mandarin varieties and its syntax based on the written vernacular. It is the official spoken language of the People's Republic of China (where it is called Pǔtōnghuà "common speech"), the de facto official language of the Republic of China governing Taiwan (as Guóyǔ "national language") and one of the official languages of Singapore (as Huáyǔ "Chinese language"). Standard Chinese now dominates public life, and is much more widely studied than any other variety of Chinese.

=== English in the United Kingdom ===
In the United Kingdom, the standard language is British English, which is based upon the language of the medieval court of Chancery of England and Wales. In the late-seventeenth and early eighteenth centuries, Standard English became established as the linguistic norm of the upper class, composed of the peerage and the gentry. Socially, the accent of the spoken version of the standard language then indicated that the speaker was a man or a woman possessed of a good education, and thus of high social prestige. In England and Wales, Standard English is usually associated with Received Pronunciation, "the standard accent of English as spoken in the south of England", but it may also be spoken with other accents, and in other countries still other accents are used (Australian, Canadian, American, Scottish, etc.).

=== Greek ===
The standard form of Modern Greek is based on the Southern dialects; these dialects are spoken mainly in the Peloponnese, the Ionian Islands, Attica, Crete and the Cyclades.

=== Hindi–Urdu ===
Two standardized registers of the Hindustani language have legal status in India: Standard Hindi (one of 23 co-official national languages) and Urdu (Pakistan's official tongue); as a result, Hindustani is often called "Hindi-Urdu".

=== Irish ===
An Caighdeán Oifigiúil ('The Official Standard'), often shortened to An Caighdeán, is the official standard of the Irish language. It was first published by the translators in Dáil Éireann in the 1950s. As of September 2013, the first major revision of the Caighdeán Oifigiúil is available, both online and in print. Among the changes to be found in the revised version are, for example, various attempts to bring the recommendations of the Caighdeán closer to the spoken dialect of Gaeltacht speakers, including allowing further use of the nominative case where the genitive would historically have been found.

=== Italian ===
Standard Italian is derived from the Tuscan dialect, specifically from its Florentine variety—the Florentine influence upon early Italian literature established that dialect as base for the standard language of Italy. In particular, Italian became the language of culture for all the people of Italy, thanks to the prestige of the masterpieces of Florentine authors like Dante Alighieri, as well as to the political and cultural significance of Florence at the time and the fact that it was linguistically an intermediate between the northern and the southern Italian dialects. It would later become the official language of all the Italian states, and after the Italian unification it became the national language of the Kingdom of Italy. Modern Standard Italian's lexicon has been deeply influenced by almost all regional languages of Italy.

=== Latin ===
The standard language in the Roman Republic (509 BC – 27 BC) and the Roman Empire (27 BC – AD 1453) was Classical Latin, the literary dialect spoken by upper classes of Roman society, whilst Vulgar Latin was the sociolect (colloquial language) spoken by the educated and uneducated peoples of the middle and the lower social classes of Roman society. The Latin language that Roman armies introduced to Gaul, Hispania, and Dacia had a grammar, syntax, and vocabulary different from the Classical Latin spoken and written by the statesman Cicero.

=== Portuguese ===
==== Brazil ====
In Brazil, actors and journalists usually adopt an unofficial, but de facto, spoken standard of Brazilian Portuguese, originally derived from the middle-class dialects of Rio de Janeiro and Brasília, but that now encompasses educated urban pronunciations from the different speech communities in the southeast. This artificial accent is called sotaque neutro. In that standard, ⟨s⟩ represents the phoneme /s/ when it appears at the end of a syllable (whereas in Rio de Janeiro this represents /ʃ/) and the rhotic consonant spelled ⟨r⟩ is pronounced [h] in the same situation (whereas in São Paulo this is usually an alveolar flap or trill).

The sociolect of prestige of mineiro spoken in the capital of Minas Gerais, Belo Horizonte, is the accent from Brazilian Portuguese that is the nearest to sotaque neutro.

==== Africa and Europe ====
European and African dialects have differing realizations of /ʁ/ than Brazilian dialects, with the former using [ʁ] and [r] and the latter using [x], [h], or [χ].

=== Serbo-Croatian ===
Four standard variants of the pluricentric Serbo-Croatian are spoken in Bosnia and Herzegovina, Croatia, Montenegro, and Serbia. They all have the same dialect basis (Štokavian). These variants do differ slightly, as is the case with other pluricentric languages, but not to a degree that would justify considering them as different languages. The differences between the variants do not hinder mutual intelligibility and do not undermine the integrity of the system as a whole. Compared to the differences between the variants of English, German, French, Spanish, or Portuguese, the distinctions between the variants of Serbo-Croatian are less significant.Nonetheless, Serbia, Croatia, Bosnia and Herzegovina, and Montenegro have all named the language differently in their constitutions.

=== Somali ===
In Somalia, Northern Somali (or North-Central Somali) forms the basis for Standard Somali, particularly the Mudug dialect of the northern Darod clan. Northern Central Somali has frequently been used by famous Somali poets as well as the political elite, and thus has the most prestige among other Somali dialects.

== Encoding ==
The Unicode Common Locale Data Repository uses 001 as the region subtag for a standardized form such as ar-001 for Modern Standard Arabic.

== See also ==
- Classical language
- Covert prestige
- Koiné language
- Language secessionism
- Literary language
- National language
- Nonstandard dialect
- Official language
- Vernacular

== Bibliography ==
- Ammon, Ulrich (2004). "Standard variety". In Ammon, Ulrich; Dittmar, Norbert; Mattheier, Klaus J.; Trudgill, Peter (eds.). Sociolinguistics. Vol. 1. Walter de Gruyter. pp. 273–283. ISBN 978-3-11-014189-4.
- Auer, Peter (2011). "Dialect vs. standard: a typology of scenarios in Europe". In Kortmann, Bernd; van der Auwera, Johan (eds.). The languages and linguistics of Europe : a comprehensive guide. Walter de Gruyter. pp. 485–500. ISBN 978-3-11-022025-4.
- BBC (June 2005). "Beginners' Blas". BBC.
- Baugh, Albert C.; Cable, Thomas (2002). A History of the English Language (5th ed.). London: Routledge. ISBN 978-0-415-28098-3.
- Bex, Tony (2008). "'Standard' English, Discourse Grammars and English Language Teaching". In Locher, M. A.; Strässler, J. (eds.). Standards and Norms in the English Language. De Gruyter. pp. 221–238.
- Blake, N. F. (1996). A History of the English Language. Basingstoke: Palgrave. ISBN 978-0-8147-1313-6.
- Blum, Daniel (2002). Sprache und Politik: Sprachpolitik und Sprachnationalismus in der Republik Indien und dem sozialistischen Jugoslawien (1945-1991) [Language and Policy: Language Policy and Linguistic Nationalism in the Republic of India and the Socialist Yugoslavia (1945-1991)]. Beiträge zur Südasienforschung (in German). Vol. 192. Würzburg: Ergon. ISBN 3-89913-253-X. OCLC 51961066.
- Brozović, Dalibor (1992). "Serbo-Croatian as a pluricentric language". In Clyne, Michael G (ed.). Pluricentric Languages: Differing Norms in Different Nations. Contributions to the sociology of language 62. Berlin & New York: Mouton de Gruyter. ISBN 9783110128550. OCLC 24668375.
- Carter, Ronald (1999). "Standard Grammars, Spoken Grammars: Some Educational Implications.". In Bex, Tony; Watts, R.J. (eds.). Standard English: The Widening Debate. Routledge. pp. 149–166.
- Chambers, J.K.; Trudgill, Peter (1998). Dialectology (2nd ed.). Cambridge University Press. ISBN 978-0-521-59646-6.
- Charity Hudley, Anne H.; Mallinson, Christine (2011). Understanding English Language Variation in U.S. Schools. New York: Teachers College Press. ISBN 9780807774021.
- Clyne, Michael G., ed. (1992). Pluricentric Languages: Differing Norms in Different Nations. Contributions to the sociology of language. Vol. 62. Berlin & New York: Mouton de Gruyter. ISBN 3-11-012855-1.
- Coletti, Vittorio (2011). "Storia della lingua". Istituto della Enciclopedia italiana.
- Curzan, Anne (2002). "Teaching the Politics of Standard English". Journal of English Linguistics. 30 (4): 339–352. doi:10.1177/007542402237882. S2CID 143816335.
- Dalby, Andrew (1998). Dictionary of languages: the definitive reference to more than 400 languages. Columbia University Press.
- Davila, Bethany (2016). "The Inevitability of 'Standard' English: Discursive Constructions of Standard Language Ideologies". Written Communication. 33 (2): 127–148. doi:10.1177/0741088316632186. S2CID 147594600.
- Dunaj, Bogusław (1989). Język mieszkańców Krakowa, część I (in Polish). Warszawa-Kraków: Nakł. Uniwersytetu Jagiellońskiego. p. 134.
- Eachach, Vivian Uíbh, ed. (2012). An Caighdeán Oifigiúil—Caighdeán Athbhreithnithe (PDF) (in Irish). Seirbhís Thithe an Oireachtais. Archived from the original (PDF) on 6 May 2013.
- Finegan, Edward (2007). Language: Its Structure and Use (5th ed.). Boston, MA: Thomson Wadsworth. ISBN 978-1-4130-3055-6.
- "Foilseacháin Rialtais / Government Publications—Don tSeachtain dar críoch 25 Iúil 2012 / For the week ended 25 July 2012" (PDF) (in Irish and English). Rialtas na hÉireann. 27 July 2012. "M67B Gramadach na Gaeilge 9781406425766 390 10.00"
- Gröschel, Bernhard (2009). Das Serbokroatische zwischen Linguistik und Politik: mit einer Bibliographie zum postjugoslavischen Sprachenstreit [Serbo-Croatian Between Linguistics and Politics: With a Bibliography of the Post-Yugoslav Language Dispute]. Lincom Studies in Slavic Linguistics (in German). Vol. 34. Munich: Lincom Europa. ISBN 978-3-929075-79-3. LCCN 2009473660. OCLC 428012015. OL 15295665W.
- Horrocks, Geoffrey (1997). Greek: A History of the Language and its Speakers (1st ed.). London: Longman. ISBN 9780582307094.
- Inoue, M. (2006). "Standardization". In Brown, Keith (ed.). Encyclopedia of Language and Linguistics. Vol. 12 (2nd ed.). Elsevier. pp. 121–127. ISBN 978-0-08-044299-0.
- Kafadar, Enisa (2009). "Bosnisch, Kroatisch, Serbisch – Wie spricht man eigentlich in Bosnien-Herzegowina?" [Bosnian, Croatian, Serbian – How do people really speak in Bosnia-Herzegovina?]. In Henn-Memmesheimer, Beate; Franz, Joachim (eds.). Die Ordnung des Standard und die Differenzierung der Diskurse; Teil 1 (in German). Frankfurt am Main: Peter Lang. pp. 95–106. ISBN 9783631599174. OCLC 699514676.
- Kapović, Mate (2011). "Language, Ideology and Politics in Croatia" (PDF). Slavia Centralis. iv (2). Archived from the original (PDF) on 22 January 2020.
- Kloss, Heinz (1967). "'Abstand languages' and 'ausbau languages'". Anthropological Linguistics. 9 (7): 29–41. JSTOR 30029461.
- Kordić, Snježana (2004). "Pro und kontra: "Serbokroatisch" heute" [Pro and contra: "Serbo-Croatian" nowadays] (PDF). In Krause, Marion; Sappok, Christian (eds.). Slavistische Linguistik 2002: Referate des XXVIII. Konstanzer Slavistischen Arbeitstreffens, Bochum 10.-12. September 2002. Slavistishe Beiträge; vol. 434 (in German). Munich: Otto Sagner. pp. 97–148. ISBN 3-87690-885-X. OCLC 56198470. SSRN 3434516. CROSBI 430499. Archived (PDF) from the original on 4 August 2012.
- Kordić, Snježana (2007). "La langue croate, serbe, bosniaque et monténégrine" [Croatian, Serbian, Bosniakian, and Montenegrin] (PDF). In Madelain, Anne (ed.). Au sud de l'Est. vol. 3 (in French). Paris: Non Lieu. pp. 71–78. ISBN 978-2-35270-036-4. OCLC 182916790. SSRN 3439662. CROSBI 429734. Archived (PDF) from the original on 4 August 2012.
- Kordić, Snježana (2009). "Policentrični standardni jezik" [Polycentric Standard Language] (PDF). In Badurina, Lada; Pranjković, Ivo; Silić, Josip (eds.). Jezični varijeteti i nacionalni identiteti (in Serbo-Croatian). Zagreb: Disput. pp. 83–108. ISBN 978-953-260-054-4. OCLC 437306433. SSRN 3438216. CROSBI 426269. Archived (PDF) from the original on 4 August 2012.
- Kordić, Snježana (2010). Jezik i nacionalizam [Language and Nationalism] (PDF). Rotulus Universitas (in Serbo-Croatian). Zagreb: Durieux. doi:10.2139/ssrn.3467646. ISBN 978-953-188-311-5. LCCN 2011520778. OCLC 729837512. OL 15270636W. CROSBI 475567. Archived (PDF) from the original on 1 June 2012.
- Kristophson, Jürgen (2000). "Vom Widersinn der Dialektologie: Gedanken zum Štokavischen" [Dialectological Nonsense: Thoughts on Shtokavian]. Zeitschrift für Balkanologie (in German). 36 (2). ISSN 0044-2356. ZDB-ID 201058-6.
- Langston, Keith; Peti-Stantić, Anita (2014). Language Planning and National Identity in Croatia. Palgrave Studies in Minority Languages and Communities. Springer. ISBN 9781137390608.
- Lepschy, Anna Laura; Lepschy, Giulio C. (1988). The Italian language today (2nd ed.). New York: New Amsterdam. p. 260. ISBN 978-0-941533-22-5. OCLC 17650220.
- Maiden, Martin (2014). A Linguistic History of Italian. Taylor & Francis. p. 318. ISBN 9781317899273.
- Mateus, Maria Helena; d'Andrade, Ernesto (2000). The Phonology of Portuguese. Oxford University Press. ISBN 0-19-823581-X.
- Methadžović, Almir (10 April 2015). "Naučnoznanstvena-znanstvenonaučna istina" [Scientific truth] (in Serbo-Croatian). Mostar: Tačno.net. Archived from the original on 16 April 2015.
- McArthur, Tom; McArthur, Feri (1992). The Oxford Companion to the English Language. Oxford University Press. ISBN 9780192141835.
- Milroy, James (2007). "The Ideology of the Standard Language". In Llamas, Carmen; Mullany, Louise; Stockwell, Peter (eds.). The Routledge Companion to Sociolinguistics. London: Routledge. pp. 133–13. ISBN 978-0203441497. OCLC 76969042.
- Milroy, James; Milroy, Lesley (2012). Authority in Language: Investigating Standard English' (4th ed.). New York: Routledge. ISBN 978-0-415-69683-8.
- Ní Shúilleabháin, Niamh (2 August 2012). "Caighdeán Athbhreithnithe don Ghaeilge". Gaelport.com (in Irish). Archived from the original on 2 August 2012.
- Norman, Jerry (1988). Chinese. Cambridge: Cambridge University Press. ISBN 978-0-521-29653-3.
- Palmer, L.R. (1988). The Latin Language. University of Oklahoma. ISBN 0-8061-2136-X.
- Pearsall, Judy, ed. (1999). The Concise Oxford English Dictionary (10th ed.).
- Pohl, Hans-Dieter (1996). "Serbokroatisch - Rückblick und Ausblick" [Serbo-Croatian – Looking backward and forward]. In Ohnheiser, Ingeborg (ed.). Wechselbeziehungen zwischen slawischen Sprachen, Literaturen und Kulturen in Vergangenheit und Gegenwart: Akten der Tagung aus Anlaß des 25jährigen Bestehens des Instituts für Slawistik an der Universität Innsbruck, Innsbruck, 25. - 27. Mai 1995. Innsbrucker Beiträge zur Kulturwissenschaft, Slavica aenipontana (in German). Vol. 4. Innsbruck: Non Lieu. pp. 205–221. OCLC 243829127.
- Richards, Jack Croft; Schmidt, Richard W. (2010). Longman Dictionary of Language Teaching and Applied Linguistics. Pearson Education Limited. ISBN 978-1-4082-0460-3.
- Romaine, Suzanne (2008). "Linguistic Diversity and Language Standardization". In Hellinger, Marlis; Pauwels, Anne (eds.). Handbook of Language and Communication: Diversity and Change. Walter de Gruyter. ISBN 9783110198539.
- Saeed, John (1999). Somali. Amsterdam: John Benjamins. ISBN 1-55619-224-X.
- Silverstein, Michael (1996). "Monoglot 'Standard' in America: Standardization and Metaphors of Linguistic Hegemony". In Brennis, Donald; Macaulay, Ronald H.S (eds.). The Matrix of Language. Routledge. pp. 284–306.
- Šipka, Danko (2019). Lexical layers of identity: words, meaning, and culture in the Slavic languages. New York: Cambridge University Press. doi:10.1017/9781108685795. ISBN 978-953-313-086-6. LCCN 2018048005. OCLC 1061308790. S2CID 150383965.
- Smith, Jeremy (1996). An Historical Study of English: Function, Form and Change. London: Routledge. ISBN 978-0-415-13273-2.
- "Літературна мова (стандарт)". Соціологія (in Ukrainian).
- Starčević, Anđel (2016). "Govorimo hrvatski ili 'hrvatski': standardni dijalekt i jezične ideologije u institucionalnom diskursu". Suvremena Lingvistika (in Serbo-Croatian). 81. University of Zagreb: 67–103.
- Stewart, William A. (1968). "A Sociolinguistic Typology for Describing National Multilingualism". In Fishman, Joshua A (ed.). Readings in the Sociology of Language. The Hague, Paris: Mouton. pp. 529–545. doi:10.1515/9783110805376.531. ISBN 978-3-11-080537-6. OCLC 306499.
- Сулейменова, Элеонора Д. (2006). Словарь социолингвистических терминов (in Russian). Moscow: Российская академия наук. Институт языкознания. Российская академия лингвистических наук.
- Thomas, Paul-Louis (2003). "Le serbo-croate (bosniaque, croate, monténégrin, serbe): de l'étude d'une langue à l'identité des langues" [Serbo-Croatian (Bosnian, Croatian, Montenegrin, Serbian): from the study of a language to the identity of languages]. Revue des études slaves (in French). 74 (2–3): 311–325. doi:10.3406/slave.2002.6801. ISSN 0080-2557. OCLC 754204160. ZDB-ID 208723-6.
- Trudgill, Peter (1992). "Ausbau sociolinguistics and the perception of language status in contemporary Europe". International Journal of Applied Linguistics. 2 (2): 167–177. doi:10.1111/j.1473-4192.1992.tb00031.x.
- Trudgill, Peter (2004). "Glocalisation and the Ausbau sociolinguistics of modern Europe". In Anna Duszak, Urszula Okulska (ed.). Speaking from the margin: global English from a European perspective. Frankfurt: Peter Lang. pp. 35–49. ISBN 9783631526637.
- Trudgill, Peter (2006). "Standard and Dialect Vocabulary". In Brown, Keith (ed.). Encyclopedia of Language and Linguistics. Vol. 12 (2nd ed.). Elsevier. pp. 119–121. ISBN 978-0-08-044299-0.
- Van Mol, Mark (2003). Variation in Modern Standard Arabic in Radio News Broadcasts: A Synchronic Descriptive Investigation into the Use of Complementary Particles. Peeters Publishers. ISBN 9789042911581.
- Vogl, Ulrike (2012). "Multilingualism in a Standard Language Culture". In Hüning; Vogl, Ulrike; Moliner, Olivier (eds.). Standard Languages and Multilingualism in European History. Multilingualism and diversity management. Vol. 1. John Benjamins Publishing. ISBN 9789027200556.
- Williams, Raymond (1983). "Standards". Keywords: A Vocabulary of Culture and Society' (2nd ed.). Oxford University Press. pp. 296–299.
