= Linguistic demography =

Statistical study of languages among all populations

Linguistic demography is the statistical study of languages among all populations. Estimating the number of speakers of a given language is not straightforward, and various estimates may diverge considerably. This is first of all due to the question of defining "language" vs. "dialect". Identification of varieties as a single language or as distinct languages is often based on ethnic, cultural, or political considerations rather than mutual intelligibility. The second difficulty is multilingualism, complicating the definition of "native language". Finally, in many countries, insufficient census data add to the difficulties.

Demolinguistics is a branch of Sociology of language observing linguistic trends as affected by population distribution and redistribution and by the status of societies.

== Most spoken languages ==
Languages by number of native speakers

The following table compares the estimates of Comrie (1998) and Weber (1997) (number of native speakers in millions). Also given are the estimates of SIL Ethnologue (2005). Comparing estimates that do not date to the same year is problematic due to the 1.14% per year growth of world population (with significant regional differences).

	Language	Comrie (1998)	Weber (1997)	SIL
1.	Mandarin Chinese	836	1,100	1,205 (1999)
2.-4.	Hindustani	333	250	422 (2001)
2.-4.	Spanish	332	300	322 (1995)
2.-4.	English	322	300	309 (1984)
5.-6.	Arabic	186	200	323 (2008)
5.-6.	Bengali	189	185	171 (1994)
7.-8.	Russian	170	160	145 (2000)
7.-8.	Portuguese	170	160	178 (1995)
9.	Japanese	125	125	122 (1985)
10.	German	100	100	95.4 (1994)

This table shows that for the world's largest languages, it is impossible to give an estimate of the number of native speakers with a certainty better than maybe 10% or 20% or so.

== See also ==
- List of languages by number of native speakers
- List of languages by total number of speakers
- Abstand and ausbau languages
- Autonomous language
- Language geography
- Languages in censuses

Case studies:

- Language demographics of Quebec
- Language Spoken at Home

== Literature ==
- Johanna Nichols, Linguistic Diversity in Space and Time, University of Chicago Press (1992), ISBN 978-0-226-58056-2.
- David I. Kertzer and Dominique Arel (eds.), Census and Indentiry : The Politics of Race, Ethnicity, and Language in National Censuses, ISBN 978-0-521-80823-1.
- Jacques Pohl, Demolinguistics and Language Problems (1972).
- H. Kloss, G. McConnell (eds.), Linguistic Composition of the Nations of the World vol. 2, North America, Quebec (1974–1984).
- Vittorio Dell’Aquila and Gabriele Iannàccaro. “The geolinguistic treatment of demolinguistic data.” In Jeroen Darquennes, Joe Salmons & Wim Vandenbussche (eds.), Language Contact, vol. 1, pp. 523–535. De Gruyter, 2019.
