= Ladin Dolomitan =

Constructed standard variety of Ladin

- Ladin Standard
- Created by: Heinrich Schmid on behalf of SPELL
- Date: 1998
- Setting and usage: a common written standard for the ladin languages
- Ethnicity: Ladins
- Purpose: Constructed language: Ladin Dolomitan
- Writing system: Latin
- Sources: Ladin language

Official status
- Regulated by: SPELL

Language codes
- ISO 639-2: art
- ISO 639-3: –

Ladin Dolomitan or standard Ladin is the standard written constructed language (Dachsprache) based on the similarities of the five main dialect-groups of Ladin. It is the desired outcome of the project called SPELL (Servisc per la Planificazion y Elaborazion dl Lingaz Ladin – "service for the planning and preparation of the Ladin language") under the initiative of The Union Generala di Ladins dles Dolomites (project owner) and the Ladin cultural institutes Micurà de Rü, Majon di Fascegn and Istitut Pedagogich Ladin to create a unified standard written language.

== History ==
The contract to work on the project was given in 1988 by representatives from the Dolomite Ladins to the Zurich Professor Heinrich Schmid, who had previously designed the Dachsprache Rumantsch Grischun written language. Schmid accepted this challenge and in 1998 he published for standard Ladin its Guidelines for the Development of a Common Written Language of the Dolomite Ladins (Wegleitung für den Aufbau einer gemeinsamen Schriftsprache der Dolomitenladiner), in which the outlines for the new written language were presented. All written forms of Ladin Dolomitan words are carried over from spoken forms already existing in the spoken dialects based on a principle of the lowest common denominator in language formation. Its popularity within the Ladin community varies by valley and dialect spoken.

== Goals and current status ==
The goal of Ladin Dolomitan is not to replace or displace the existing Ladin languages of the different valleys but rather to serve as a Dachsprache and standard language for communication between speakers of the different dialects. This may also reduce the administrative burden of authorities and organization, which are not only linked to a single valley. For example, it allows for the administration of the South Tyrol to use a single Ladin language form for the communities in Val Gardena and Val Badia. Today, some institutions, such as the Union Generela di Ladins dles Dolomites (the umbrella organization of the Sella Ladin), the Comunanza Ladina de Bulsan, and the Free University of Bozen-Bolzano, use Ladin Dolomitan as the default language in their publications.

== Phonology ==
Consonant phonemes
		Labial	Dental/ Alveolar	Palatal	Velar	Glottal
Nasal		m	n	ɲ	ŋ	
Plosive	voiceless	p	t		k	
Plosive	voiced	b	d		ɡ	
Affricate	voiceless		ts	tʃ		
Affricate	voiced			dʒ		
Fricative	voiceless	f	s	ʃ		h
Fricative	voiced	v	z	ʒ		
Trill			r			
Approximant			l			

Vowel phonemes
	Front	Central	Back
Close	i		u
Close mid	e		o
Open mid	ɛ	ɜ	ɔ
Open		a	

== Morphology ==
=== Articles ===
definite article	Singular	Plural
masculine	l	i
feminine	la/ l' (before a vowel)	lis

indefinite article	Singular	Plural
masculine	n	–
feminine	na/ n' (before a vowel)	–

Example: l pere 'the father', n pere 'a father', la ciasa 'the house', na ciasa 'a house'

=== Plurals ===
Ladin dolomitan like other West Romance languages uses the sigmatic plural.

- In general, words ending in a consonant use -es: volp – volpes – pel – peles;
- words ending in -a or -e use -es: roda – rodes;
- words ending in -n or in a stressed vowel (-é, -ù etc.) use -s: man – mans;
- words ending in -f use -ves: sief – sieves; and
- words ending in -sc use the plural suffix -jes: ousc – oujes.

Additionally, there are some irregular forms: pe – piesc etc.

=== Comparative ===
The comparative is formed using plu ('more') + adjective: vedla ('old') – plu vedla ('older'). Superlatives are formed using a comparative preceded by the corresponding article: la plu vedla ('the oldest'). There is a negative comparative, too, using manco ('few'): la manco vedla} ('the least oldest' = 'the youngest').

=== Pronouns ===
Person/ number	unstressed (proclitic)	stressed
1. Ps. Sg.	i	ie
2. Ps. Sg.	te	tu
3. Ps. Sg.	al (m.)/ ala (f.)	el (m.)/ ela (f.)
1. Ps. Pl.	i	nos
2. Ps. Pl.	i	vos
3. Ps. Pl.	ai (m.)/ ales (f.)	ei (m.)/ eles (f.)

The second person plural beginning in a majuscule Vos is used as a polite form in singular too.

Ladin is not a pro-drop language, the unstressed personal pronoun is never omitted (e.g.: al pluev 'it rains'). There is an unpersonal pronoun in singular an. The stressed pronouns are used to stress the agent. Ladin uses special enclitic pronouns for questions:

Person/ number	unstressed (enclitic)
1. Ps. Sg.	-i
2. Ps. Sg.	-te
3. Ps. Sg.	-el (m.)/ -ela (f.)
1. Ps. Pl.	-se
2. Ps. Pl.	-e
3. Ps. Pl.	-ei (m.)/ eles (f.)

E.g. the sentence Tu ciantes ('You sing') changes to Cianteste? ('Do you sing?')

=== Verbal Morphology ===
Conjungation of regular verbs on -é (lat. -are) in present tense:

Person/ number	cianté 'sing'	cianté (interrogative)
1. Ps. Sg.	ciante	cianti?
2. Ps. Sg.	ciantes	cianteste?
3. Ps. Sg.	cianta	ciàntel/ ciàntela/ ciànten?
1. Ps. Pl.	cianton	ciantonse
2. Ps. Pl.	cianteis	cianteise
3. Ps. Pl.	cianta	ciàntei/ ciànteles?

== Orthography ==
The proposed orthographic conventions largely follow the Italian orthography. It is compatible with the unified orthography for the ladin dialects.
