= SRR =

SRR may refer to:

- The ICAO designator for Maersk Air Cargo, a Danish airline
- Savannah River Remediation, involved in waste operations at Savannah River Site
- Search and rescue region
- Shake, Rattle & Roll, a Filipino horror anthology film series
- Shake, Rattle and Roll, a song by Jesse Stone
- SRR IPC, a Linux message-passing project
- Serer language, a language with ISO 639 code srr
- Serine racemase, an enzyme encoded by the SRR gene
- Short range radar for cars
- Sierra Blanca Regional Airport, Ruidoso, New Mexico, US, IATA Code
- Societad Retorumantscha, a Swiss language association
- Russian Amateur Radio Union, СРР (Cyrillic) or SRR
- Special Reconnaissance Regiment of UK Special Forces
- Split-ring resonator in metamaterials
- System Requirements Review, a U.S. Department of Defense process
- Socialist Republic of Romania, Socialist country in Eastern Europe during the Cold War
- Specific resistance resource, a concept in the salutogenic model of health
