= Autonomy =

Capacity for control, discretion or political self-governance

In developmental psychology and moral, political, bioethical philosophy, autonomy (Note: Ancient Greek: αὐτονομία, romanized: autonomia, from αὐτόνομος, autonomos, from αὐτο- auto- "self" and νόμος nomos, "law", hence when combined understood to mean "one who gives oneself one's own law") is the capacity to make an informed, uncoerced decision. Autonomous organizations or institutions are independent or self-governing. Autonomy can also be defined from a human resources perspective, where it denotes a (relatively high) level of discretion granted to an employee in their work. In such cases, autonomy is known to generally increase job satisfaction. Self-actualized individuals are thought to operate autonomously of external expectations. In a medical context, respect for a patient's personal autonomy is considered one of many fundamental ethical principles in medicine.

In artificial intelligence, autonomy is the capacity of an autonomous agent to perform complex tasks independently.

== Sociology ==
In the sociology of knowledge, a controversy over the boundaries of autonomy inhibited analysis of any concept beyond relative autonomy, until a typology of autonomy was created and developed within science and technology studies. According to it, the institution of science's existing autonomy is "reflexive autonomy": actors and structures within the scientific field are able to translate or to reflect diverse themes presented by social and political fields, as well as influence them regarding the thematic choices on research projects.

=== Institutional autonomy ===
Institutional autonomy is having the capacity as a legislator to be able to implant and pursue official goals. Autonomous institutions are responsible for finding sufficient resources or modifying their plans, programs, courses, responsibilities, and services accordingly. But in doing so, they must contend with any obstacles that can occur, such as social pressure against cut-backs or socioeconomic difficulties. From a legislator's point of view, to increase institutional autonomy, conditions of self-management and institutional self-governance must be put in place. An increase in leadership and a redistribution of decision-making responsibilities would be beneficial to the research of resources.

Institutional autonomy was often seen as a synonym for self-determination, and many governments feared that it would lead institutions to an irredentist or secessionist region. But autonomy should be seen as a solution to self-determination struggles. Self-determination is a movement toward independence, whereas autonomy is a way to accommodate the distinct regions/groups within a country. Institutional autonomy can diffuse conflicts regarding minorities and ethnic groups in a society. Allowing more autonomy to groups and institutions helps create diplomatic relationships between them and the central government.

== Politics ==
In governmental parlance, autonomy refers to self-governance. An example of an autonomous jurisdiction was the former United States governance of the Philippine Islands. The Philippine Autonomy Act of 1916 provided the framework for the creation of an autonomous government under which the Filipino people had broader domestic autonomy than previously, although it reserved certain privileges to the United States to protect its sovereign rights and interests. Other examples include Kosovo (as the Socialist Autonomous Province of Kosovo) under the former Yugoslav government of Marshal Tito and Puntland Autonomous Region within Federal Republic of Somalia.

Although often being territorially defined as self-governments, autonomous self-governing institutions may take a non-territorial form. Such non-territorial solutions are, for example, cultural autonomy in Estonia and Hungary, national minority councils in Serbia or Sámi parliaments in Nordic countries.

== Philosophy ==
Autonomy is a key concept that has a broad impact on different fields of philosophy. In metaphysical philosophy, the concept of autonomy is referenced in discussions about free will, fatalism, determinism, and agency. In moral philosophy, autonomy refers to subjecting oneself to objective moral law.

=== According to Kant ===
Immanuel Kant (1724–1804) defined autonomy by three themes regarding contemporary ethics. Firstly, autonomy as the right for one to make their own decisions excluding any interference from others. Secondly, autonomy as the capacity to make such decisions through one's own independence of mind and after personal reflection. Thirdly, as an ideal way of living life autonomously. In summary, autonomy is the moral right one possesses, or the capacity we have in order to think and make decisions for oneself providing some degree of control or power over the events that unfold within one's everyday life.

The context in which Kant addresses autonomy is in regards to moral theory, asking both foundational and abstract questions. He believed that in order for there to be morality, there must be autonomy. "Autonomous" is derived from the Greek word autonomos where 'auto' means self and 'nomos' means to govern (nomos: as can be seen in its usage in nomárchēs which means chief of the province). Kantian autonomy also provides a sense of rational autonomy, simply meaning one rationally possesses the motivation to govern their own life. Rational autonomy entails making your own decisions but it cannot be done solely in isolation. Cooperative rational interactions are required to both develop and exercise our ability to live in a world with others.

Kant argued that morality presupposes this autonomy (German: Autonomie) in moral agents, since moral requirements are expressed in categorical imperatives. An imperative is categorical if it issues a valid command independent of personal desires or interests that would provide a reason for obeying the command. It is hypothetical if the validity of its command, if the reason why one can be expected to obey it, is the fact that one desires or is interested in something further that obedience to the command would entail. "Don't speed on the freeway if you don't want to be stopped by the police" is a hypothetical imperative. "It is wrong to break the law, so don't speed on the freeway" is a categorical imperative. The hypothetical command not to speed on the freeway is not valid for you if you do not care whether you are stopped by the police. The categorical command is valid for you either way. Autonomous moral agents can be expected to obey the command of a categorical imperative even if they lack a personal desire or interest in doing so. It remains an open question whether they will, however.

The Kantian concept of autonomy is often misconstrued, leaving out the important point about the autonomous agent's self-subjection to the moral law. It is thought that autonomy is fully explained as the ability to obey a categorical command independently of a personal desire or interest in doing so—or worse, that autonomy is "obeying" a categorical command independently of a natural desire or interest; and that heteronomy, its opposite, is acting instead on personal motives of the kind referenced in hypothetical imperatives.

In his Groundwork of the Metaphysic of Morals, Kant applied the concept of autonomy also to define the concept of personhood and human dignity. Autonomy, along with rationality, are seen by Kant as the two criteria for a meaningful life. Kant would consider a life lived without these not worth living; it would be a life of value equal to that of a plant or insect. According to Kant, autonomy is part of the reason that we hold others morally accountable for their actions. Human actions are morally praise- or blame-worthy in virtue of our autonomy. Non- autonomous beings such as plants or animals are not blameworthy due to their actions being non-autonomous. Kant's position on crime and punishment is influenced by his views on autonomy. Brainwashing or drugging criminals into being law-abiding citizens would be immoral as it would not be respecting their autonomy. Rehabilitation must be sought in a way that respects their autonomy and dignity as human beings.

=== According to Nietzsche ===
Friedrich Nietzsche wrote about autonomy and the moral fight. Autonomy in this sense is referred to as the free self and entails several aspects of the self, including self-respect and even self-love. This can be interpreted as influenced by Kant (self-respect) and Aristotle (self-love). For Nietzsche, valuing ethical autonomy can dissolve the conflict between love (self-love) and law (self-respect) which can then translate into reality through experiences of being self-responsible. Because Nietzsche defines having a sense of freedom with being responsible for one's own life, freedom and self-responsibility can be very much linked to autonomy.

=== According to Piaget ===
The Swiss psychologist Jean Piaget (1896–1980) believed that autonomy comes from within and results from a free decision. It is of intrinsic value and the morality of autonomy is not only accepted but obligatory. When an attempt at social interchange occurs, it is reciprocal, ideal and natural for there to be autonomy regardless of why the collaboration with others has taken place. For Piaget, the term autonomous can be used to explain the idea that rules are self-chosen. By choosing which rules to follow or not, we are in turn determining our own behaviour.

Piaget studied the cognitive development of children by analyzing them during their games and through interviews, establishing (among other principles) that the children's moral maturation process occurred in two phases, the first of heteronomy and the second of autonomy:

- Heteronomous reasoning: Rules are objective and unchanging. They must be literal because the authority are ordering it and do not fit exceptions or discussions. The base of the rule is the superior authority (parents, adults, the State), that it should not give reason for the rules imposed or fulfilled them in any case. Duties provided are conceived as given from oneself. Any moral motivation and sentiments are possible through what one believes to be right.
- Autonomous reasoning: Rules are the product of an agreement and, therefore, are modifiable. They can be subject to interpretation and fit exceptions and objections. The base of the rule is its own acceptance, and its meaning has to be explained. Sanctions must be proportionate to the absence, assuming that sometimes offenses can go unpunished, so that collective punishment is unacceptable if it is not the guilty. The circumstances may not punish a guilty. Duties provided are conceived as given from the outside. One follows rules mechanically as it is simply a rule, or as a way to avoid a form of punishment.

=== According to Kohlberg ===
The American psychologist Lawrence Kohlberg (1927–1987) continues the studies of Piaget. His studies collected information from different latitudes to eliminate the cultural variability, and focused on the moral reasoning, and not so much in the behavior or its consequences. Through interviews with adolescent and teenage boys, who were to try and solve "moral dilemmas", Kohlberg went on to further develop the stages of moral development. The answers they provided could be one of two things. Either they choose to obey a given law, authority figure or rule of some sort or they chose to take actions that would serve a human need but in turn break this given rule or command.

The most popular moral dilemma asked involved the wife of a man approaching death due to a special type of cancer. Because the drug was too expensive to obtain on his own, and because the pharmacist who discovered and sold the drug had no compassion for him and only wanted profits, he stole it. Kohlberg asks these adolescent and teenage boys (10-, 13- and 16-year-olds) if they think that is what the husband should have done or not. Therefore, depending on their decisions, they provided answers to Kohlberg about deeper rationales and thoughts and determined what they value as important. This value then determined the "structure" of their moral reasoning.

Kohlberg established three stages of morality, each of which is subdivided into two levels. They are read in progressive sense, that is, higher levels indicate greater autonomy.

- Level 1: Premoral/Preconventional Morality: Standards are met (or not met) depending on the hedonistic or physical consequences.
  - [Stage 0: Egocentric Judgment: There is no moral concept independent of individual wishes, including a lack of concept of rules or obligations.]
  - Stage 1: Punishment-Obedience Orientation: The rule is obeyed only to avoid punishment. Physical consequences determine goodness or badness and power is deferred to unquestioningly with no respect for the human or moral value, or the meaning of these consequences. Concern is for the self.
  - Stage 2: Instrumental-Relativist Orientation: Morals are individualistic and egocentric. There is an exchange of interests but always under the point of view of satisfying personal needs. Elements of fairness and reciprocity are present but these are interpreted in a pragmatic way, instead of an experience of gratitude or justice. Egocentric in nature but beginning to incorporate the ability to see things from the perspective of others.
- Level 2: Conventional Morality/Role Conformity: Rules are obeyed according to the established conventions of a society.
  - Stage 3: Good Boy–Nice Girl Orientation: Morals are conceived in accordance with the stereotypical social role. Rules are obeyed to obtain the approval of the immediate group and the right actions are judged based on what would please others or give the impression that one is a good person. Actions are evaluated according to intentions.
  - Stage 4: Law and Order Orientation: Morals are judged in accordance with the authority of the system, or the needs of the social order. Laws and order are prioritized.
- Level 3: Postconventional Morality/Self-Accepted Moral Principles: Standards of moral behavior are internalized. Morals are governed by rational judgment, derived from a conscious reflection on the recognition of the value of the individual inside a conventionally established society.
  - Stage 5: Social Contract Orientation: There are individual rights and standards that have been lawfully established as basic universal values. Rules are agreed upon by through procedure and society comes to consensus through critical examination in order to benefit the greater good.
  - Stage 6: Universal Principle Orientation: Abstract ethical principles are obeyed on a personal level in addition to societal rules and conventions. Universal principles of justice, reciprocity, equality and human dignity are internalized and if one fails to live up to these ideals, guilt or self-condemnation results.

=== According to Audi ===
Robert Audi characterizes autonomy as the self-governing power to bring reasons to bear in directing one's conduct and influencing one's propositional attitudes. Traditionally, autonomy is only concerned with practical matters. But, as Audi's definition suggests, autonomy may be applied to responding to reasons at large, not just to practical reasons. Autonomy is closely related to freedom but the two can come apart. An example would be a political prisoner who is forced to make a statement in favor of his opponents in order to ensure that his loved ones are not harmed. As Audi points out, the prisoner lacks freedom but still has autonomy since his statement, though not reflecting his political ideals, is still an expression of his commitment to his loved ones.

Autonomy is often equated with self-legislation in the Kantian tradition. Self-legislation may be interpreted as laying down laws or principles that are to be followed. Audi agrees with this school in the sense that we should bring reasons to bear in a principled way. Responding to reasons by mere whim may still be considered free but not autonomous. A commitment to principles and projects, on the other hand, provides autonomous agents with an identity over time and gives them a sense of the kind of persons they want to be. But autonomy is neutral as to which principles or projects the agent endorses. So different autonomous agents may follow very different principles. But, as Audi points out, self-legislation is not sufficient for autonomy since laws that do not have any practical impact do not constitute autonomy. Some form of motivational force or executive power is necessary in order to get from mere self-legislation to self-government. This motivation may be inherent in the corresponding practical judgment itself, a position known as motivational internalism, or may come to the practical judgment externally in the form of some desire independent of the judgment, as motivational externalism holds.

In the Humean tradition, intrinsic desires are the reasons the autonomous agent should respond to. This theory is called instrumentalism. Audi rejects instrumentalism and suggests that we should adopt a position known as axiological objectivism. The central idea of this outlook is that objective values, and not subjective desires, are the sources of normativity and therefore determine what autonomous agents should do.

== Child development ==
Autonomy in childhood and adolescence is when one strives to gain a sense of oneself as a separate, self-governing individual. Between ages 1–3, during the second stage of Erikson's and Freud's stages of development, the psychosocial crisis that occurs is autonomy versus shame and doubt. The significant event that occurs during this stage is that children must learn to be autonomous, and failure to do so may lead to the child doubting their own abilities and feel ashamed. When a child becomes autonomous it allows them to explore and acquire new skills. Autonomy has two vital aspects wherein there is an emotional component where one relies more on themselves rather than their parents and a behavioural component where one makes decisions independently by using their judgement. The styles of child rearing affect the development of a child's autonomy. Autonomy in adolescence is closely related to their quest for identity. In adolescence parents and peers act as agents of influence. Peer influence in early adolescence may help the process of an adolescent to gradually become more autonomous by being less susceptible to parental or peer influence as they get older. In adolescence the most important developmental task is to develop a healthy sense of autonomy.

== Religion ==
In Christianity, autonomy is manifested as a partial self-governance on various levels of church administration. During the history of Christianity, there were two basic types of autonomy. Some important parishes and monasteries have been given special autonomous rights and privileges, and the best known example of monastic autonomy is the famous Eastern Orthodox monastic community on Mount Athos in Greece. On the other hand, administrative autonomy of entire ecclesiastical provinces has throughout history included various degrees of internal self-governance.

In ecclesiology of Eastern Orthodox Churches, there is a clear distinction between autonomy and autocephaly, since autocephalous churches have full self-governance and independence, while every autonomous church is subject to some autocephalous church, having a certain degree of internal self-governance. Since every autonomous church had its own historical path to ecclesiastical autonomy, there are significant differences between various autonomous churches in respect of their particular degrees of self-governance. For example, churches that are autonomous can have their highest-ranking bishops, such as an archbishop or metropolitan, appointed or confirmed by the patriarch of the mother church from which it was granted its autonomy, but generally they remain self-governing in many other respects.

In the history of Western Christianity the question of ecclesiastical autonomy was also one of the most important questions, especially during the first centuries of Christianity, since various archbishops and metropolitans in Western Europe have often opposed centralizing tendencies of the Church of Rome. As of 2019, the Catholic Church comprises 24 autonomous (sui iuris) Churches in communion with the Holy See. Various denominations of Protestant churches usually have more decentralized power, and churches may be autonomous, thus having their own rules or laws of government, at the national, local, or even individual level.

Sartre brings the concept of the Cartesian god being totally free and autonomous. He states that existence precedes essence with god being the creator of the essences, eternal truths and divine will. This pure freedom of god relates to human freedom and autonomy; where a human is not subjected to pre-existing ideas and values.

According to the first amendment, In the United States of America, the federal government is restricted in building a national church. This is due to the first amendment's recognizing people's freedom's to worship their faith according to their own belief's. For example, the American government has removed the church from their "sphere of authority" due to the churches' historical impact on politics and their authority on the public. This was the beginning of the disestablishment process. The Protestant churches in the United States had a significant impact on American culture in the nineteenth century, when they organized the establishment of schools, hospitals, orphanages, colleges, magazines, and so forth. This has brought up the famous, however, misinterpreted term of the separation of church and state. These churches lost the legislative and financial support from the state.

=== The disestablishment process ===
The first disestablishment began with the introduction of the bill of rights. In the twentieth century, due to the great depression of the 1930s and the completion of the second world war, the American churches were revived. Specifically the Protestant churches. This was the beginning of the second disestablishment when churches had become popular again but held no legislative power. One of the reasons why the churches gained attendance and popularity was due to the baby boom, when soldiers came back from the second world war and started their families. The large influx of newborns gave the churches a new wave of followers. However, these followers did not hold the same beliefs as their parents and brought about the political, and religious revolutions of the 1960s.

During the 1960s, the collapse of religious and cultural middle brought upon the third disestablishment. Religion became more important to the individual and less so to the community. The changes brought from these revolutions significantly increased the personal autonomy of individuals due to the lack of structural restraints giving them added freedom of choice. This concept is known as "new voluntarism" where individuals have free choice on how to be religious and the free choice whether to be religious or not.

== Medicine ==
In a medical context, respect for a patient's personal autonomy is considered amongst the fundamental ethical principles in medicine. Autonomy can be defined as the ability of the person to make their own decisions. This faith in autonomy is the central premise of the concept of informed consent and shared decision making. This idea, while considered essential to today's practice of medicine, was developed in the last 50 years. According to Tom Beauchamp and James Childress (in Principles of Biomedical Ethics), the Nuremberg trials detailed accounts of horrifyingly exploitative medical "experiments" which violated the subjects' physical integrity and personal autonomy. These incidences prompted calls for safeguards in medical research, such as the Nuremberg Code which stressed the importance of voluntary participation in medical research. It is believed that the Nuremberg Code served as the premise for many current documents regarding research ethics.

Respect for autonomy became incorporated in health care and patients could be allowed to make personal decisions about the health care services that they receive. Notably, autonomy has several aspects as well as challenges that affect health care operations. The manner in which a patient is handled may undermine or support the autonomy of a patient and for this reason, the way a patient is communicated to becomes very crucial. A good relationship between a patient and a health care practitioner needs to be well defined to ensure that autonomy of a patient is respected. Just like in any other life situation, a patient would not like to be under the control of another person. The move to emphasize respect for patient's autonomy rose from the vulnerabilities that were pointed out in regards to autonomy.

However, autonomy does not only apply in a research context. Users of the health care system have the right to be treated with respect for their autonomy, instead of being dominated by the physician. This is referred to as paternalism. While paternalism is meant to be overall good for the patient, this can very easily interfere with autonomy. Through the therapeutic relationship, a thoughtful dialogue between the client and the physician may lead to better outcomes for the client, as he or she is more of a participant in decision-making.

There are many different definitions of autonomy, many of which place the individual in a social context. Relational autonomy, which suggests that a person is defined through their relationships with others, is increasingly considered in medicine and particularly in critical and end-of-life care. Supported autonomy suggests instead that in specific circumstances it may be necessary to temporarily compromise the autonomy of the person in the short term in order to preserve their autonomy in the long-term. Other definitions of the autonomy imagine the person as a contained and self-sufficient being whose rights should not be compromised under any circumstance.

There are also differing views with regard to whether modern health care systems should be shifting to greater patient autonomy or a more paternalistic approach. For example, there are such arguments that suggest the current patient autonomy practiced is plagued by flaws such as misconceptions of treatment and cultural differences, and that health care systems should be shifting to greater paternalism on the part of the physician given their expertise. On the other hand, other approaches suggest that there simply needs to be an increase in relational understanding between patients and health practitioners to improve patient autonomy.

One argument in favor of greater patient autonomy and its benefits is by Dave deBronkart, who believes that in the technological advancement age, patients are capable of doing a lot of their research on medical issues from their home. According to deBronkart, this helps to promote better discussions between patients and physicians during hospital visits, ultimately easing up the workload of physicians. deBronkart argues that this leads to greater patient empowerment and a more educative health care system. In opposition to this view, technological advancements can sometimes be viewed as an unfavorable way of promoting patient autonomy. For example, self-testing medical procedures which have become increasingly common are argued by Greaney et al. to increase patient autonomy, however, may not be promoting what is best for the patient. In this argument, contrary to deBronkart, the current perceptions of patient autonomy are excessively over-selling the benefits of individual autonomy, and is not the most suitable way to go about treating patients. Instead, a more inclusive form of autonomy should be implemented, relational autonomy, which factors into consideration those close to the patient as well as the physician. These different concepts of autonomy can be troublesome as the acting physician is faced with deciding which concept he/she will implement into their clinical practice. It is often references as one of the four pillars of medicine, alongside beneficence, justice and nonmaleficence

Autonomy varies and some patients find it overwhelming especially the minors when faced with emergency situations. Issues arise in emergency room situations where there may not be time to consider the principle of patient autonomy. Various ethical challenges are faced in these situations when time is critical, and patient consciousness may be limited. However, in such settings where informed consent may be compromised, the working physician evaluates each individual case to make the most professional and ethically sound decision. For example, it is believed that neurosurgeons in such situations, should generally do everything they can to respect patient autonomy. In the situation in which a patient is unable to make an autonomous decision, the neurosurgeon should discuss with the surrogate decision maker in order to aid in the decision-making process. Performing surgery on a patient without informed consent is in general thought to only be ethically justified when the neurosurgeon and his/her team render the patient to not have the capacity to make autonomous decisions. If the patient is capable of making an autonomous decision, these situations are generally less ethically strenuous as the decision is typically respected.

Not every patient is capable of making an autonomous decision. For example, a commonly proposed question is at what age children should be partaking in treatment decisions. This question arises as children develop differently, therefore making it difficult to establish a standard age at which children should become more autonomous. Those who are unable to make the decisions prompt a challenge to medical practitioners since it becomes difficult to determine the ability of a patient to make a decision. To some extent, it has been said that emphasis of autonomy in health care has undermined the practice of health care practitioners to improve the health of their patient as necessary. The scenario has led to tension in the relationship between a patient and a health care practitioner. This is because as much as a physician wants to prevent a patient from suffering, they still have to respect autonomy. Beneficence is a principle allowing physicians to act responsibly in their practice and in the best interests of their patients, which may involve overlooking autonomy. However, the gap between a patient and a physician has led to problems because in other cases, the patients have complained of not being adequately informed.

The seven elements of informed consent (as defined by Beauchamp and Childress) include threshold elements (competence and voluntariness), information elements (disclosure, recommendation, and understanding) and consent elements (decision and authorization). Some philosophers such as Harry Frankfurt consider Beauchamp and Childress criteria insufficient. They claim that an action can only be considered autonomous if it involves the exercise of the capacity to form higher-order values about desires when acting intentionally. What this means is that patients may understand their situation and choices but would not be autonomous unless the patient is able to form value judgements about their reasons for choosing treatment options they would not be acting autonomously.

In certain unique circumstances, government may have the right to temporarily override the right to bodily integrity in order to preserve the life and well-being of the person. Such action can be described using the principle of "supported autonomy", a concept that was developed to describe unique situations in mental health (examples include the forced feeding of a person dying from the eating disorder anorexia nervosa, or the temporary treatment of a person living with a psychotic disorder with antipsychotic medication). While controversial, the principle of supported autonomy aligns with the role of government to protect the life and liberty of its citizens. Terrence F. Ackerman has highlighted problems with these situations, he claims that by undertaking this course of action physician or governments run the risk of misinterpreting a conflict of values as a constraining effect of illness on a patient's autonomy.

Since the 1960s, there have been attempts to increase patient autonomy including the requirement that physician's take bioethics courses during their time in medical school. Despite large-scale commitment to promoting patient autonomy, public mistrust of medicine in developed countries has remained. Onora O'Neill has ascribed this lack of trust to medical institutions and professionals introducing measures that benefit themselves, not the patient. O'Neill claims that this focus on autonomy promotion has been at the expense of issues like distribution of healthcare resources and public health.

One proposal to increase patient autonomy is through the use of support staff. The use of support staff including medical assistants, physician assistants, nurse practitioners, nurses, and other staff that can promote patient interests and better patient care. Nurses especially can learn about patient beliefs and values in order to increase informed consent and possibly persuade the patient through logic and reason to entertain a certain treatment plan. This would promote both autonomy and beneficence, while keeping the physician's integrity intact. Furthermore, Humphreys asserts that nurses should have professional autonomy within their scope of practice (35–37). Humphreys argues that if nurses exercise their professional autonomy more, then there will be an increase in patient autonomy (35–37).

== International human rights law ==
After the Second World War, there was a push for international human rights that came in many waves. Autonomy as a basic human right started the building block in the beginning of these layers alongside liberty. The Universal declarations of Human rights of 1948 has made mention of autonomy or the legal protected right to individual self-determination in article 22.

Documents such as the United Nations Declaration on the Rights of Indigenous Peoples reconfirm international law in the aspect of human rights because those laws were already there, but it is also responsible for making sure that the laws highlighted when it comes to autonomy, cultural and integrity; and land rights are made within an indigenous context by taking special attention to their historical and contemporary events

The United Nations Declaration on the Rights of Indigenous Peoples article 3 also through international law provides Human rights for Indigenous individuals by giving them a right to self-determination, meaning they have all the liberties to choose their political status, and are capable to go and improve their economic, social, and cultural statuses in society, by developing it. Another example of this is article 4 of the same document which gives them autonomous rights when it comes to their internal or local affairs and how they can fund themselves in order to be able to self govern themselves.

Minorities in countries are also protected as well by international law; the 27th article of the United Nations International covenant on Civil and Political rights or the ICCPR does so by allowing these individuals to be able to enjoy their own culture or use their language. Minorities in that manner are people from ethnic religious or linguistic groups according to the document.

The European Court of Human rights, is an international court that has been created on behalf of the European Conventions of Human rights. However, when it comes to autonomy they did not explicitly state it when it comes to the rights that individuals have. The current article 8 has remedied to that when the case of Pretty v the United Kingdom, a case in 2002 involving assisted suicide, where autonomy was used as a legal right in law. It was where Autonomy was distinguished and its reach into law was marked as well making it the foundations for legal precedent in making case law originating from the European Court of Human rights.

The Yogyakarta Principles, a document with no binding effect in international human rights law, contend that "self-determination" used as meaning of autonomy on one's own matters including informed consent or sexual and reproductive rights, is integral for one's self-defined or gender identity and refused any medical procedures as a requirement for legal recognition of the gender identity of transgender. If eventually accepted by the international community in a treaty, this would make these ideas human rights in the law. The Convention on the Rights of Persons with Disabilities also defines autonomy as principles of rights of a person with disability including "the freedom to make one's own choices, and independence of persons".

== Celebrity culture on teenage autonomy ==
A study conducted by David C. Giles and John Maltby conveyed that after age-affecting factors were removed, a high emotional autonomy was a significant predictor of celebrity interest, as well as high attachment to peers with a low attachment to parents. Patterns of intense personal interest in celebrities was found to be conjunction with low levels of closeness and security. Furthermore, the results suggested that adults with a secondary group of pseudo-friends during development from parental attachment, usually focus solely on one particular celebrity, which could be due to difficulties in making this transition.

== Various uses ==
- In computing, an autonomous peripheral is one that can be used with the computer turned off.
- Within self-determination theory in psychology, autonomy refers to 'autonomy support versus control', "hypothesizing that autonomy-supportive social contexts tend to facilitate self-determined motivation, healthy development, and optimal functioning."
- In mathematical analysis, an ordinary differential equation is said to be autonomous if it is time-independent.
- In linguistics, an autonomous language is one which is independent of other languages, for example, has a standard variety, grammar books, dictionaries or literature, etc.
- In robotics, "autonomy means independence of control. This characterization implies that autonomy is a property of the relation between two agents, in the case of robotics, of the relations between the designer and the autonomous robot. Self-sufficiency, situatedness, learning or development, and evolution increase an agent's degree of autonomy.", according to Rolf Pfeifer.
- In spaceflight, autonomy can also refer to crewed missions that are operating without control by ground controllers.
- In economics, autonomous consumption is consumption expenditure when income levels are zero, making spending autonomous to income.
- In politics, autonomous territories are States wishing to retain territorial integrity in opposition to ethnic or indigenous demands for self-determination or independence (sovereignty).
- In anti-establishment activism, an autonomous space is another name for a non-governmental social center or free space (for community interaction).
- In social psychology, autonomy is a personality trait characterized by a focus on personal achievement, independence, and a preference for solitude, often labeled as an opposite of sociotropy.

== Limits to autonomy ==
Autonomy can be limited. For instance, by disabilities, civil society organizations may achieve a degree of autonomy albeit nested within—and relative to—formal bureaucratic and administrative regimes. Community partners can therefore assume a hybridity of capture and autonomy—or a mutuality—that is rather nuanced.

=== Semi-autonomy ===
The term semi-autonomy (coined with prefix semi- / "half") designates partial or limited autonomy. As a relative term, it is usually applied to various semi-autonomous entities or processes that are substantially or functionally limited, in comparison to other fully autonomous entities or processes.

=== Quasi-autonomy ===
The term quasi-autonomy (coined with prefix quasi- / "resembling" or "appearing") designates formally acquired or proclaimed, but functionally limited or constrained autonomy. As a descriptive term, it is usually applied to various quasi-autonomous entities or processes that are formally designated or labeled as autonomous, but in reality remain functionally dependent or influenced by some other entity or process. An example for such use of the term can be seen in common designation for quasi-autonomous non-governmental organizations.

== See also ==
- Autonomism
- Autonomy Day
- Cornelius Castoriadis
- Counterdependency
- Direct democracy
- Empowerment
- Equality of autonomy
- Essential facilities doctrine
- Flat organization
- Job autonomy
- Home rule
- List of autonomous areas by country
- List of freedom indices
- Personal boundaries
- Self-governing colony
- Self-sufficiency
- Takis Fotopoulos
- Teaching for social justice
- Viable system model
- Workplace democracy
