= Heteronomy =

Philosophical concept

Heteronomy refers to action that is influenced by a force outside the individual, in other words the state or condition of being ruled, governed, or under the sway of another, as in a military occupation. It is the counter/opposite of autonomy.

Philosopher Cornelius Castoriadis contrasted heteronomy with autonomy by noting that while all societies create their own institutions (laws, traditions and behaviors), autonomous societies are those in which their members are aware of this fact, and explicitly self-institute (αυτονομούνται). In contrast, the members of heteronomous societies (hetero- 'other') attribute their imaginaries to some extra-social authority (e.g., God, the state, ancestors, historical necessity, etc.). Immanuel Kant, drawing on Jean-Jacques Rousseau, considered such an action nonmoral.

== See also ==
- Autonomy and heteronomy (linguistics)
- Heteronomous annulation
- Marx's theory of alienation
- Social alienation
