= Heinrich Schmid =

Swiss linguist (1921–1999)

Heinrich Schmid (6 April 1921 – 23 February 1999) was a Swiss linguist and "father" of the Rhaeto-Romance Dachsprachen ("umbrella languages") Rumantsch Grischun and Ladin Dolomitan.

== Early life ==
Heinrich Schmid lived his entire life in the same house in Zürich in which he was born. Although he was born with a hearing impairment, he discovered a love for languages at a young age learning Greek alongside Latin and the Romance languages French, Italian, Spanish and the different varieties of Romansh.

== Education ==
After matriculating, he read Romance studies at the University of Zürich. He graduated with first class honours (summa cum laude) in 1946, the core theme of his studies being the History of Languages and the Geography of Languages.

== Career ==
After a stay in Florence he returned to Switzerland where it was very difficult for him to find a suitable occupation due to his hearing impairment. He was eventually taken on as an employee for the Rhätisches Namenbuch (Rhaetian Lexicon of Names) and contributed for 15 years to the Dicziunari Rumantsch Grischun.

In 1962 he qualified to work as professor at the University of Zürich. Within a short period of time he became an assistant professor and three years later was promoted to an associate professor position. A busy but less spectacular academic career followed.

Shortly before retiring from his teaching career in 1983, the Lia Rumantscha (Romansh League) asked him to create a common written language for the five main varieties of the Romansh language. In April 1982, after only six months of intense work, he presented his guidelines for the common written language. This was followed by lively discussions and journeys to the whole Romansh language area, where he tirelessly promoted the common written language and was able to allay many reservations. As a result, the Romansh language has been publicly recognised to a much greater extent in Switzerland and a new vitality entered the Romansh-speaking area which also included Ladin.

In 1988, representatives from the Dolomite Ladins gave Heinrich Schmid the task of also creating a common written format of the Ladin language. Schmid accepted this challenge and produced the publication entitled Wegleitung für den Aufbau einer gemeinsamen Schriftsprache der Dolomitenladiner (Guidelines for the Development of a Common Written Language for the Dolomite Ladins). However, he did not live to see the Italian publication of this fundamental work, as he died of a heart attack in February 1999.
