= Dicziunari Rumantsch Grischun =

Romansh language dictionary

The Dicziunari Rumantsch Grischun (abbreviation DRG) is the biggest dictionary of the Romansh language.

Founded in 1904 by the Indo-Europeanist Robert von Planta and the Societad Retorumantscha, which still bears the responsibility for editing it. It comprises the Romansh dialects and idioms spoken in the Swiss canton of Graubünden.

The term Rumantsch Grischun means "the Romansh language spoken in Graubünden" and should not be confused with the standard written language (Dachsprache) created in the 20th century with the name of Rumantsch Grischun.

The first 13 volumes of the Romansh dictionary became available online in December 2018. The digitalization of the dictionary was done by hand-typing in Nanjing, China, due to the expensive cost in Europe.

== Bibliography ==
- Annalas da la Societad Retorumantscha, 1886 ff.
