= List of Somali poets =

This is a list of Somali poets.

Somali society is synonymous with poetry and also has a longstanding oratory tradition. Of internationally available published verse, Arabic poetry has the oldest and most diverse corpus. With Greater Somalia's proximity to the Middle East, similar attachments to poetry exist in Somali culture and traditions. Poetry has played an important role in Somali society since antiquity. Urban and rural poets memorized entire volumes of poems, with some spanning centuries.

== A ==
- Abdi Aden Haad (Abdi Qays)
- Abdillahi Suldaan Mohammed Timacade
- Abwan Jama Kadiye
- Abdulle GeDada Masiti
- Aadan-Gurey Maxamed Cabdille
- Yamyam (Abdulkadir Hersi Siyad)
- Ahmed Saleban Bide

== B ==
- Barre Maxamed Fiidow "Leento"
- Abdi Bashir Indhobuur

== C ==
- Cali Dhuux Adan Gorayo

== F ==
- Farah Hussein Sharmarke

== H ==
- Haji Ali Majeerteen
- Hassan Sheikh Mumin

== I ==
- Ismail Mire

== K ==
- k'naan
- Kite Fiqi

== L ==
- Ladan Osman

== M ==
- Mohamed Ibrahim Warsame (Hadraawi)
- Mohammed Abdullah Hassan (Sayid Mohamed)
- Mohamed Nur Fadal
- Mohamud Siad Togane

== N ==
- Nuruddin Farah

== S ==
- Salaan Carrabey
- Said Salah Ahmed
- Shadya Yasin
- Shaykh Sufi

== W ==
- Warsame Shire Awale
- Warsan Shire
- Yamyam
