= Dialect =

Variant of a language

A dialect (Note: The word has multiple derivations: Middle French dialecte, Classical Latin dialectos, and Ancient Greek διάλεκτος (diálektos), 'discourse', in turn derived from διά (diá), 'through', and λέγω (légō), 'I speak'.) is a variety of language spoken by a particular group of people. This may include dominant and standardized varieties as well as vernacular, unwritten, or non-standardized varieties, such as those used in developing countries or isolated areas. The dialects of the same language are mainly distinguished from each other by differences in linguistic features such as phonology, morphology, syntax and vocabulary.

The term "dialect" is most often used to refer to regional dialects—i.e., linguistic varieties that are spoken in a particular geographical region, distinguished from those of other regions. Varieties associated with groups defined in other ways may be referred to with more specialized terms such as sociolect (the dialect of a social class), ethnolect (the dialect of an ethnic group) and idiolect (the dialect of a particular individual).

The non-standard dialects of a language with a writing system will operate at different degrees of distance from the standardized written form. An oral dialect or idiolect may be portrayed in written form with eye dialect.

== Standard and nonstandard dialects ==
A standard dialect, also known as a "standardized language", is supported by institutions. Such institutional support may include any or all of the following: government recognition or designation; formal presentation in schooling as the "correct" form of a language; informal monitoring of everyday usage; published grammars, dictionaries, and textbooks that set forth a normative spoken and written form; and an extensive formal literature (be it prose, poetry, non-fiction, etc.) that uses it. An example of a standardized language is the French language which is supported by the Académie Française institution. A nonstandard dialect also has a complete grammar and vocabulary, but is usually not the beneficiary of institutional support and has undergone little to no codification.

The distinction between the "standard" dialect and the "nonstandard" (vernacular) dialects of the same language is often arbitrary and based on social, political, cultural, or historical considerations or prevalence and prominence. In a similar way, the definitions of the terms "language" and "dialect" may overlap and are often subject to debate, with the differentiation between the two classifications often grounded in arbitrary or sociopolitical motives, and the term "dialect" is sometimes restricted to mean "non-standard variety", particularly in non-specialist settings and non-English linguistic traditions.

Einar Haugen outlined a four-step process through which dialects can be "promoted" to the status of independent languages:

1. Selection of an existing dialect (often that of the elite) to become the standard variety,
2. Codification of that variety, e.g., through dictionaries and grammars,
3. Elaboration of the variety to be used in the broadest possible range of contexts, particularly official ones,
4. Acceptance by the population, e.g., learning in schools and use in formal contexts.

== Dialect as linguistic variety of a language ==
The term "dialect" is most often used to refer to regional dialects or regiolects—i.e., linguistic varieties that are spoken in a particular geographical region, distinguished from those of other regions. However, a dialect may also be defined in other ways such as sociolect (the dialect of a social class) or ethnolect (the dialect of an ethnic group). An idiolect is the unique variety of language used by a particular individual.

According to this definition, any variety of a given language can be classified as "a dialect", including any standardized varieties. In this case, the distinction between the "standard language" (i.e. the "standard" dialect of a particular language) and the "nonstandard" (vernacular) dialects of the same language is often arbitrary and based on social, political, cultural, or historical considerations or prevalence and prominence. In a similar way, the definitions of the terms "language" and "dialect" may overlap and are often subject to debate, with the differentiation between the two classifications often grounded in arbitrary or sociopolitical motives.

The term "dialect" is sometimes restricted to mean "non-standard variety", particularly in non-specialist settings and non-English linguistic traditions. Conversely, some dialectologists have reserved the term "dialect" for forms that they believed (sometimes wrongly) to be purer forms of the older languages, as in how early dialectologists of English did not consider the Brummie of Birmingham or the Scouse of Liverpool to be real dialects, as they had arisen fairly recently in time and partly as a result of influences from Irish migrants.

=== Difference between dialects and languages ===
There is no universally accepted criterion for determining whether two varieties are two different languages or two dialects of the same language. A number of rough measures exist, sometimes leading to contradictory results. The distinction between dialect and language is therefore subjective and depends upon the user's preferred frame of reference. For example, there has been discussion about whether or not the Limonese Creole should be considered "a kind" of English or a different language. This creole is spoken in the Caribbean coast of Costa Rica (Central America) by descendants of Jamaican people. The position that Costa Rican linguists support often depends upon which university they represent. Another example is Scanian, which even, for a time, had its own ISO code.

Eugenio Coșeriu distinguishes between "historic languages" and three kinds of dialects. A historic language is recognized as such by its speakers as well as speakers of other languages, generally through a specific name, such as "English" or "the English language." It has a historic tradition of being spoken and is distinguished from other historic languages. It is not language-internal characteristics that define a historic language, but rather social, political, cultural, and other factors. Language varieties that have not established themselves as historic languages fall into three categories. Primary dialects existed before the constitution of a historic language. Coșeriu lists the example of Asturian and Navarro-Aragonese, which existed alongside the Castilian dialect that was elevated to the status of the "Spanish language." Secondary dialects developed through the geographic differentiation of an established historic language, e.g., American varieties of Spanish or Andalusian Spanish. Tertiary dialects are geographic realizations of the exemplary standard language. In the case of Spanish, this would include, for example, Andalusian forms of standard Spanish.

=== Linguistic distance ===
An important criterion for categorizing varieties of language is linguistic distance. For a variety to be considered a dialect, the linguistic distance between the two varieties must be low. Linguistic distance between spoken or written forms of language increases as the differences between the forms are characterized. For example, two languages with completely different syntactical structures would have a high linguistic distance, while a language with very few differences from another may be considered a dialect or a sibling of that language. Linguistic distance may be used to determine language families and language siblings. For example, languages with little linguistic distance, like Dutch and German, are considered siblings. Dutch and German are siblings in the West-Germanic language group. Some language siblings are closer to each other in terms of linguistic distance than to other linguistic siblings. French and Spanish, siblings in the Romance Branch of the Indo-European group, are closer to each other than they are to any of the languages of the West-Germanic group. When languages are close in terms of linguistic distance, they resemble one another, hence why dialects are not considered linguistically distant to their parent language.

=== Mutual intelligibility ===
One criterion, which is often considered to be purely linguistic, is that of mutual intelligibility: two varieties are said to be dialects of the same language if being a speaker of one variety entails sufficient knowledge to understand and be understood by a speaker of the other variety; otherwise, they are said to be different languages. However, this definition has often been criticized, especially in the case of a dialect continuum (or dialect chain), which contains a sequence of varieties, where each is mutually intelligible with the next, but may not be mutually intelligible with distant varieties.

Others have argued that mutual intelligibility occurs in varying degrees, and that it may be difficult to distinguish between true mutual intelligibility and prior familiarity with the other variety. However, recent research suggests that there is some empirical evidence in favor of using some form of the intelligibility criterion to distinguish between languages and dialects, though mutuality may not be as relevant as initially thought. The requirement for mutuality is abandoned by the Language Survey Reference Guide of SIL International, publishers of the Ethnologue and the registration authority for the ISO 639-3 standard for language codes. They define a dialect cluster as a central variety together with all those varieties whose speakers understand the central variety at a specified threshold level or higher. If the threshold level is high, usually between 70% and 85%, the cluster is designated as a language.

=== Sociolinguistic definitions ===
Local varieties in the West Germanic dialect continuum are oriented towards either Standard Dutch or Standard German depending on which side of the border they are spoken on.

Another occasionally used criterion for discriminating dialects from languages is the sociolinguistic notion of linguistic authority. According to this definition, two varieties are considered dialects of the same language if (under at least some circumstances) they would defer to the same authority regarding some questions about their language. For instance, to learn the name of a new invention, or an obscure foreign species of plant, speakers of Westphalian and East Franconian German might each consult a German dictionary or ask a German-speaking expert in the subject. Thus these varieties are said to be dependent on, or heteronomous with respect to, Standard German, which is said to be autonomous.

In contrast, speakers in the Netherlands of Low Saxon varieties similar to Westphalian would instead consult a dictionary of Standard Dutch, and hence is categorized as a dialect of Dutch instead. Similarly, although Yiddish is classified by linguists as a language in the High German group of languages and has some degree of mutual intelligibility with German, a Yiddish speaker would consult a Yiddish dictionary rather than a German dictionary in such a case, and is classified as its own language.

Within this framework, W. A. Stewart defined a language as an autonomous variety in addition to all the varieties that are heteronomous with respect to it, noting that an essentially equivalent definition had been stated by Charles A. Ferguson and John J. Gumperz in 1960. A heteronomous variety may be considered a dialect of a language defined in this way. In these terms, Danish and Norwegian, though mutually intelligible to a large degree, are considered separate languages. In the framework of Heinz Kloss, these are described as languages by ausbau (development) rather than by abstand (separation).

=== Dialect and language clusters ===
In other situations, a closely related group of varieties possess considerable (though incomplete) mutual intelligibility, but none dominates the others. To describe this situation, the editors of the Handbook of African Languages introduced the term dialect cluster as a classificatory unit at the same level as a language. A similar situation, but with a greater degree of mutual unintelligibility, has been termed a language cluster.

In the Language Survey Reference Guide issued by SIL International, who produce Ethnologue, a dialect cluster is defined as a central variety together with a collection of varieties whose speakers can understand the central variety at a specified threshold level (usually between 70% and 85%) or higher. It is not required that peripheral varieties be understood by speakers of the central variety or of other peripheral varieties. A minimal set of central varieties providing coverage of a dialect continuum may be selected algorithmically from intelligibility data.

=== Political factors ===
In many societies, however, a particular dialect, often the sociolect of the elite class, comes to be identified as the "standard" or "proper" version of a language by those seeking to make a social distinction and is contrasted with other varieties. As a result of this, in some contexts, the term "dialect" refers specifically to varieties with low social status. In this secondary sense of "dialect", language varieties are often called dialects rather than languages:

- if they have no standard or codified form,
- if they are rarely or never used in writing (outside reported speech),
- if the speakers of the given language do not have a state of their own,
- if they lack prestige with respect to some other, often standardised, variety.

The status of "language" is not solely determined by linguistic criteria, but it is also the result of a historical and political development. Romansh came to be a written language, and therefore it is recognized as a language, even though it is very close to the Lombardic alpine dialects and classical Latin. An opposite example is Chinese, whose variations such as Mandarin and Cantonese are often called dialects and not languages in China, despite their mutual unintelligibility.

National boundaries sometimes make the distinction between "language" and "dialect" an issue of political importance. A group speaking a separate "language" may be seen as having a greater claim to being a separate "people", and thus to be more deserving of its own independent state, while a group speaking a "dialect" may be seen as a sub-group, part of a bigger people, which must content itself with regional autonomy.

The Yiddish linguist Max Weinreich published the expression, a shprakh iz a dialekt mit an armey un flot (אַ שפּראַך איז אַ דיאַלעקט מיט אַן אַרמײ און פֿלאָט, lit. 'a language is a dialect with an army and navy') in YIVO Bleter 25.1, 1945, p. 13. The significance of the political factors in any attempt at answering the question "what is a language?" is great enough to cast doubt on whether any strictly linguistic definition, without a socio-cultural approach, is possible. This is illustrated by the frequency with which the army-navy aphorism is cited.

=== Linguistic terminology ===
By the definition most commonly used by linguists, any linguistic variety can be considered a "dialect" of some language—"everybody speaks a dialect". According to that interpretation, the criteria above merely serve to distinguish whether two varieties are dialects of the same language or dialects of different languages.

The terms "language" and "dialect" are not necessarily mutually exclusive, although they are often perceived to be. Thus there is nothing contradictory in the statement "the language of the Pennsylvania Dutch is a dialect of German".

Linguists may use terms like "variety" to avoid taking a position on whether the speech of a community is an independent language in its own right or a dialect of another language. A more general term is "languoid", which does not distinguish between dialects, languages, and groups of languages, whether genealogically related or not.

==== Supradialects and subdialects ====
Map of subdialects of the Kajkavian dialect of Croatian language in Međimurje County, northern Croatia

A supradialect is a dialectological category between the levels of language and dialect. It is used in two distinctive contexts, describing structural or functional relations within a particular language. As a structural category, supradialects designate the first level of dialectological subdivision within a language, as for example in pluricentric languages such as Serbo-Croatian, which is divided into three basic supradialects (Shtokavian, Kajkavian, and Chakavian), with each of them being further divided into several dialects.

As a functional category, supradialect designates a predominant dialectal form within a particular language, referring to the most commonly used variant of that language, accepted in practice by the majority of its speakers as a basic tool of mutual interaction and communication. In that context, such supradialect also functions as an interdialect.

A subdialect is a dialectological category between the levels of dialect and idiolect. Subdialects are basic subdivisions of a dialect. Subdialects can be divided further, ultimately down to idiolects. Subdialects of one dialect are generally quite close to each other, differing mainly in pronunciation and certain local words.

== Colloquial meaning ==
The term "dialect" may be colloquially used to mean a non-national language as opposed to the national language of a country. The meaning is understood in countries like Italy (see dialetto), France (see patois) and the Philippines, and carries a pejorative undertone, underlining the politically and socially subordinated status of non-national languages to the country's single official language. These "dialects" may often be historically cognate and share genetic roots in the same subfamily as the dominant national language and may even, to a varying degree, share some mutual intelligibility with the latter. In this sense, unlike in the first usage, the national language would not itself be considered a "dialect", as it is the dominant language in a particular state, be it in terms of linguistic prestige, social or political (e.g. official) status, predominance or prevalence, or all of the above.

The term "dialect" used this way implies a political connotation, being mostly used to refer to low-prestige languages (regardless of their actual degree of distance from the national language), languages lacking institutional support, or those perceived as "unsuitable for writing". The designation "dialect" is also used popularly to refer to the unwritten or non-codified languages of developing countries or isolated areas, where the term "vernacular language" would be preferred by linguists.

== Dialect and accent ==
John Lyons writes that "Many linguists [...] subsume differences of accent under differences of dialect." In general, accent refers to variations in pronunciation, while dialect also encompasses specific variations in grammar and vocabulary.

== Examples ==
=== Arabic ===
There are three geographical zones in which Arabic is spoken (Jastrow 2002). Zone I is categorized as the area in which Arabic was spoken before the rise of Islam. It is the Arabian Peninsula, excluding the areas where southern Arabian was spoken. Zone II is categorized as the areas to which Arabic speaking peoples moved as a result of the conquests of Islam. Included in Zone II are the Levant, Egypt, North Africa, Iraq, and some parts of Iran. The Egyptian, Sudanese, and Levantine dialects (including the Syrian dialect) are well documented, and widely spoken and studied. Zone III comprises the areas in which Arabic is spoken outside of the continuous Arabic Language area.

Spoken dialects of the Arabic language share the same writing system and share Modern Standard Arabic as their common prestige dialect used in writing.

=== German ===
When talking about the German language, the term German dialects is only used for the traditional regional varieties. That allows them to be distinguished from the regional varieties of modern standard German. The German dialects show a wide spectrum of variation. Some of them are not mutually intelligible. German dialectology traditionally names the major dialect groups after Germanic tribes from which they were assumed to have descended.

The extent to which the dialects are spoken varies according to a number of factors: In Northern Germany, dialects are less common than in the South. In cities, dialects are less common than in the countryside. In a public environment, dialects are less common than in a familiar environment.

The situation in Switzerland and Liechtenstein is different from the rest of the German-speaking countries. The Swiss German dialects are the default everyday language in virtually every situation, whereas standard German is only spoken in education, partially in media, and with foreigners not possessing knowledge of Swiss German. Most Swiss German speakers perceive standard German to be a foreign language.

The Low German and Low Franconian varieties spoken in Germany are often counted among the German dialects. This reflects the modern situation where they are roofed by standard German. This is different from the situation in the Middle Ages when Low German had strong tendencies towards an ausbau language.

The Frisian languages spoken in Germany and the Netherlands are excluded from the German dialects.

=== Italy ===
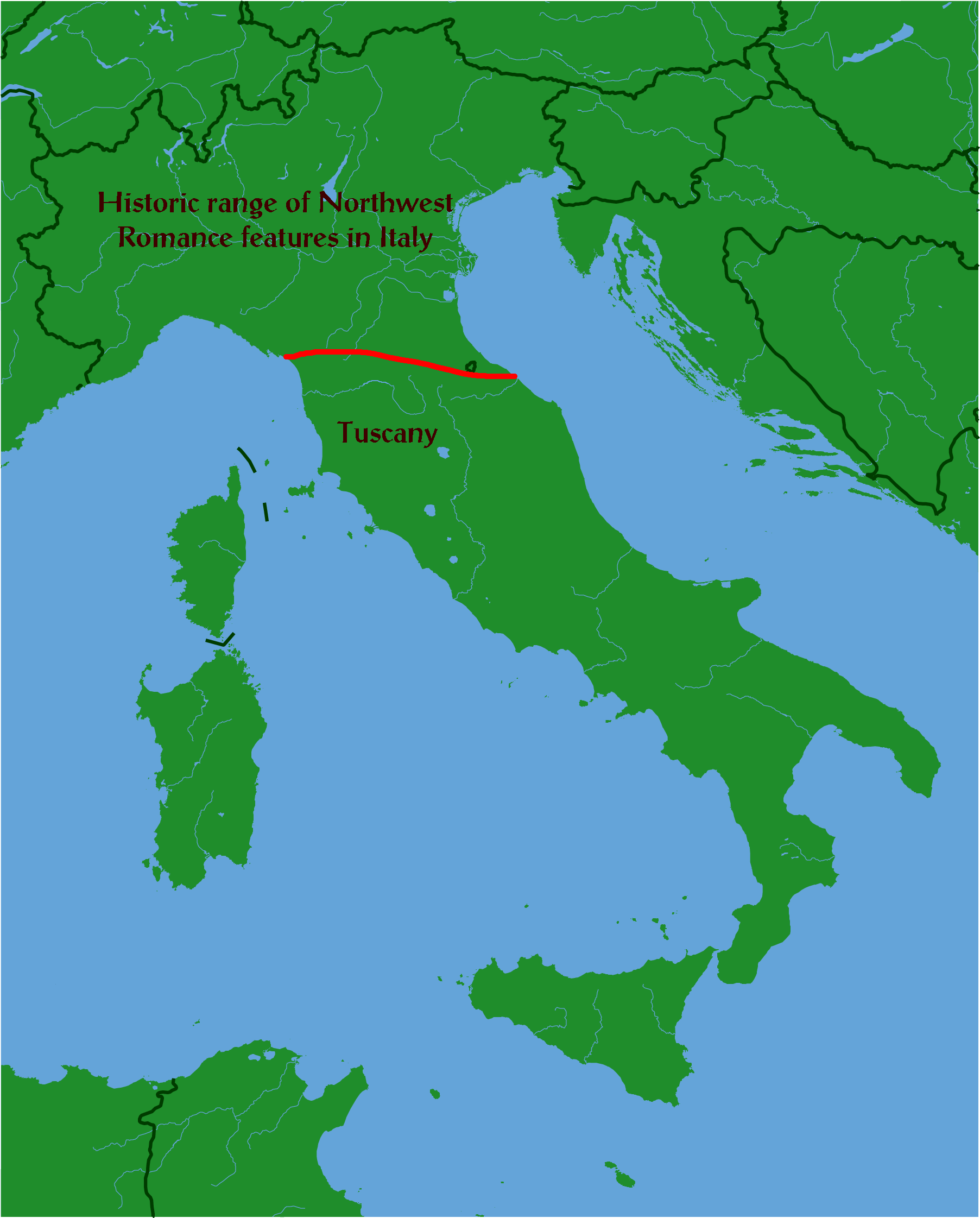
The La Spezia–Rimini Line is an isogloss between Italo-Dalmatian and Gallo-Italic languages.

Italy is an often-quoted example of a country where the second definition of the word "dialect" (dialetto) is most prevalent. Italy is in fact home to a vast array of separate languages, most of which lack mutual intelligibility with one another and have their own local varieties; twelve of them (Albanian, Catalan, German, Greek, Slovene, Croatian, French, Franco-Provençal, Friulian, Ladin, Occitan and Sardinian) underwent Italianization to varying degrees (ranging from the currently endangered state displayed by Sardinian and southern Italian Greek to the vigorous promotion of Germanic Tyrolean), but have been officially recognized as minority languages (minoranze linguistiche storiche), in light of their distinctive historical development. Yet, most of the regional languages spoken across the peninsula are often colloquially referred to in non-linguistic circles as dialetti, since most of them, including the prestigious Neapolitan, Sicilian and Venetian, have adopted vulgar Tuscan as their reference language since the Middle Ages. However, all these languages evolved from Vulgar Latin in parallel with Italian, long prior to the popular diffusion of the latter throughout what is now Italy.

During the Risorgimento, Italian still existed mainly as a literary language, and only 2.5% of Italy's population could speak Italian. Proponents of Italian nationalism, like the Lombard Alessandro Manzoni, stressed the importance of establishing a uniform national language in order to better create an Italian national identity. With the unification of Italy in the 1860s, Italian became the official national language of the new Italian state, while the other ones came to be institutionally regarded as "dialects" subordinate to Italian, and negatively associated with a lack of education.

In the early 20th century, the conscription of Italian men from all throughout Italy during World War I is credited with having facilitated the diffusion of Italian among the less educated conscripted soldiers, as these men, who had been speaking various regional languages up until then, found themselves forced to communicate with each other in a common tongue while serving in the Italian military. With the popular spread of Italian out of the intellectual circles, because of the mass-media and the establishment of public education, Italians from all regions were increasingly exposed to Italian. While dialect leveling has increased the number of Italian speakers and decreased the number of speakers of other languages native to Italy, Italians in different regions have developed variations of standard Italian specific to their region. These variations of standard Italian, known as "regional Italian", would thus more appropriately be called dialects in accordance with the first linguistic definition of the term, as they are in fact derived from Italian, with some degree of influence from the local or regional native languages and accents.

The most widely spoken languages of Italy, which are not to be confused with regional Italian, fall within a family of which even Italian is part, the Italo-Dalmatian group. This wide category includes:

- the complex of the Tuscan and Central Italian dialects, such as Romanesco in Rome, with the addition of some distantly Corsican-derived varieties (Gallurese and Sassarese) spoken in Northern Sardinia;
- the Neapolitan group (also known as "Intermediate Meridional Italian"), which encompasses not only Naples' and Campania's speech but also a variety of related neighboring varieties like the Irpinian dialect, Abruzzese and Southern Marchegiano, Molisan, Northern Calabrian or Cosentino, and the Bari dialect. The Cilentan dialect of Salerno, in Campania, is considered significantly influenced by the Neapolitan and the below-mentioned language groups;
- the Sicilian group (also known as "Extreme Meridional Italian"), including Salentino and centro-southern Calabrian.

Modern Italian is heavily based on the Florentine dialect of Tuscan. The Tuscan-based language that would eventually become modern Italian had been used in poetry and literature since at least the 12th century, and it first spread outside the Tuscan linguistic borders through the works of the so-called tre corone ("three crowns"): Dante Alighieri, Petrarch, and Giovanni Boccaccio. Florentine thus gradually rose to prominence as the volgare of the literate and upper class in Italy, and it spread throughout the peninsula and Sicily as the lingua franca among the Italian educated class as well as Italian travelling merchants. The economic prowess and cultural and artistic importance of Tuscany in the Late Middle Ages and the Renaissance further encouraged the diffusion of the Florentine-Tuscan Italian throughout Italy and among the educated and powerful, though local and regional languages remained the main languages of the common people.

Aside from Italo-Dalmatian, the second most widespread family in Italy is the Gallo-Italic group, spanning throughout much of Northern Italy's languages and dialects (such as Piedmontese, Emilian-Romagnol, Ligurian, Lombard, Sicily's and Basilicata's Gallo-Italic in southern Italy, etc.). The classification of Venetian is unclear; while most publications group it with Italo-Dalmatian languages, both Ethnologue and Glottolog group Venetian with Gallo-Italic languages. The Sardinian language, while being Romance in nature, is considered a specific linguistic family of its own, separate from other Romance languages; it is often subdivided into the Centro-Southern and Centro-Northern dialects.

Finally, other languages from a number of different families follow the last two major groups: the Gallo-Romance languages (French, Occitan and its Vivaro-Alpine dialect, Franco-Provençal); the Rhaeto-Romance languages (Friulian and Ladin); the Ibero-Romance languages (Sardinia's Algherese); the Germanic Cimbrian, Southern Bavarian, Walser German and the Mòcheno language; the Albanian Arbëresh language; the Hellenic Griko language and Calabrian Greek; the Serbo-Croatian Slavomolisano dialect; and the various Slovene languages, including the Gail Valley dialect and Istrian dialect.

Though mostly mutually unintelligible, the exact degree to which all the Italian languages are mutually unintelligible varies, often correlating with geographical distance or geographical barriers between the languages; some regional Italian languages that are closer in geographical proximity to each other or closer to each other on the dialect continuum are more or less mutually intelligible. For instance, a speaker of purely Eastern Lombard, a language in Northern Italy's Lombardy region that includes the Bergamasque dialect, would have severely limited mutual intelligibility with a purely Italian speaker and would be nearly completely unintelligible to a Sicilian-speaking individual. Due to Eastern Lombard's status as a Gallo-Italic language, an Eastern Lombard speaker may, in fact, have more mutual intelligibility with an Occitan, Catalan, or French speaker than with an Italian or Sicilian speaker. Meanwhile, a Sicilian-speaking person would have a greater degree of mutual intelligibility with a speaker of the more closely related Neapolitan language, but far less mutual intelligibility with a person speaking Sicilian Gallo-Italic, a language that developed in isolated Lombard emigrant communities on the same island as the Sicilian language.

Today, the majority of Italian nationals are able to speak Italian, though many Italians still speak their regional language regularly or as their primary day-to-day language, especially at home with family or when communicating with Italians from the same town or region.

=== The Balkans ===
The classification of speech varieties as dialects or languages and their relationship to other varieties of speech can be controversial and the verdicts inconsistent. Serbo-Croatian illustrates this point. Serbo-Croatian has two major formal variants (Serbian and Croatian). Both are based on the Shtokavian dialect and therefore mutually intelligible with differences found mostly in their respective local vocabularies and minor grammatical differences. Certain dialects of Serbia (Torlakian) and Croatia (Kajkavian and Chakavian), however, are not mutually intelligible even though they are usually subsumed under Serbo-Croatian. How these dialects should be classified in relation to Shtokavian remains a matter of dispute.

Macedonian, which is largely mutually intelligible with Bulgarian and certain dialects of Serbo-Croatian (Torlakian), is considered by Bulgarian linguists to be a Bulgarian dialect, while in North Macedonia, it is regarded as a language in its own right. Before the establishment of a literary standard of Macedonian in 1944, in most sources in and out of Bulgaria before the Second World War, the South Slavic dialect continuum covering the area of today's North Macedonia were referred to as Bulgarian dialects. Sociolinguists agree that the question of whether Macedonian is a dialect of Bulgarian or a language is a political one and cannot be resolved on a purely linguistic basis.

=== Lebanon ===
In Lebanon, a part of the Christian population considers "Lebanese" to be in some sense a distinct language from Arabic and not merely a dialect thereof. During the civil war, Christians often used Lebanese Arabic officially, and sporadically used the Latin script to write Lebanese, thus further distinguishing it from Arabic. All Lebanese laws are written in the standard literary form of Arabic, though parliamentary debate may be conducted in Lebanese Arabic.

=== Malay ===
Malay has a long history as a lingua franca (basantara) in the Malay Archipelago which currently includes Indonesia, Philippines, Malaysia, Brunei Darussalam, Singapore, East Timor, and the southern part of Thailand. This geographical variation, which then spread widely even to South Africa, finally led to the formation of a Malay language cluster which spread and had differences due to geographical conditions.

The Malay language is pluricentric and a macrolanguage, i.e., several varieties of it are standardized as the national language (bahasa kebangsaan or bahasa nasional) of several nation states with various official names: in Malaysia, it is designated as bahasa Malaysia ("Malaysian language") or bahasa Melayu ("Malay language"); in Singapore and Brunei, it is called bahasa Melayu ("Malay language"); in Indonesia, an autonomous normative variety called bahasa Indonesia ("Indonesian language") is designated the bahasa persatuan/pemersatu ("unifying language" or lingua franca) whereas the term "Malay" (bahasa Melayu) is domestically restricted to vernacular varieties of Malay indigenous to areas of Central to Southern Sumatra and West Kalimantan. (Note: Since the standardized varieties of Indonesia, Malaysia, Brunei and Singapore are structurally largely identical and mostly differ in lexicon and to a lesser degree in phonetic details, the umbrella terms "Malay/Indonesian" or "Malay-Indonesian" are often used in the linguistic literature when discussing the structure or history of the language.)

=== North Africa ===
In Tunisia, Algeria, and Morocco, the Darijas, colloquial Arabic varieties (Darija being from الدَّارِجَة, ad-dārija, "colloquial Arabic"), are sometimes considered more different from other Arabic dialects. Officially, North African countries give preference to the Literary Arabic and conduct much of their political and religious life in it (adherence to Islam), and refrain from declaring each country's specific variety to be a separate language, because Literary Arabic is the liturgical language of Islam and the language of the Islamic sacred book, the Qur'an. Although, especially since the 1960s, the Darijas are occupying an increasing use and influence in the cultural life of these countries. Examples of cultural elements where Darijas' use became dominant include: theatre, film, music, television, advertisement, social media, folk-tale books and companies' names.

=== Ukraine ===
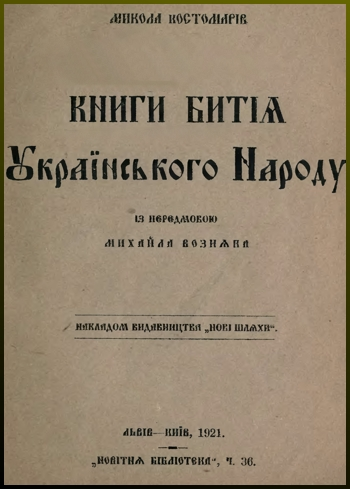
The Books of Genesis of the Ukrainian Nation by Mykola Kostomarov

The Modern Ukrainian language has been in common use since the late 17th century, associated with the establishment of the Cossack Hetmanate. In the 19th century, the Tsarist Government of the Russian Empire claimed that Ukrainian (or Little Russian, per official name) was merely a dialect of Russian (or Polonized dialect) and not a language on its own (same concept as for Belarusian language). That concepted was enrooted soon after the partitions of Poland. According to these claims, the differences were few and caused by the conquest of western Ukraine by the Polish–Lithuanian Commonwealth. However, in reality the dialects in Ukraine were developing independently from the dialects in the modern Russia for several centuries, and as a result they differed substantially.

Following the Spring of Nations in Europe and efforts of the Brotherhood of Saints Cyril and Methodius, across the so-called "Southwestern Krai" of Russian Empire started to spread cultural societies of Hromada and their Sunday schools. Themselves "hromadas" acted in same manner as Orthodox fraternities of Polish–Lithuanian Commonwealth back in 15th century. Around that time in Ukraine becoming popular political movements Narodnichestvo (Narodniks) and Khlopomanstvo.

=== Moldova ===
There have been cases of a variety of speech being deliberately reclassified to serve political purposes. One example is Moldovan. In 1996, the Moldovan Parliament, citing fears of "Romanian expansionism", rejected a proposal from President Mircea Snegur to change the name of the language to Romanian, and in 2003 a Moldovan–Romanian dictionary was published, purporting to show that the two countries speak different languages. Linguists of the Romanian Academy reacted by declaring that all the Moldovan words were also Romanian words; while in Moldova, the head of the Academy of Sciences of Moldova, Ion Bărbuţă, described the dictionary as a politically motivated "absurdity". On 22 March 2023, the president of Moldova, Maia Sandu, promulgated a law passed by Parliament that named the national language as Romanian in all legislative texts and the constitution.

=== Greater China ===
The hundreds of mutually unintelligible Chinese languages contain thousands of dialects. All are commonly referred to indiscriminately as 'dialects' in English. In the north and southwest of China the varieties are largely homogeneous, with about 50% intelligibility between Beijing and Sichuan. In the southeast the varieties are much more diverse. The main language groups in the south – Gan, Xiang, Wu, Min, Yue and Hakka – each consist of numerous mutually unintelligible languages and even more regional dialects.

From the Ming dynasty onward, Beijing has been the capital of China and the Beijing dialect of Mandarin has had the most prestige. With the founding of the Republic of China, Standard Mandarin, based on Beijing dialect with some of its more idiosyncratic elements removed, was designated the official language of the country, replacing Classical Chinese. Other Chinese languages and dialects are referred to as fangyan (regional speech). Cantonese, one of the Yue languages, is the most commonly spoken language in Guangzhou, Hong Kong, Macau and among some overseas Chinese communities, whereas Shanghainese is dominant among the Wu languages.Hokkien, one of the Min languages, has been accepted in Taiwan as an important local language alongside Mandarin.

Chinese languages other than Classical Chinese and Standard Mandarin are for the most part unwritten. Several regional languages, most notably Cantonese, have a limited literary tradition. Some of these use the Latin script, with orthographies dating from the British missionary era, and Dungan in Kazakhstan uses Cyrillic, but for the most part Chinese languages are written in logographic Chinese characters, most of which they have in common, making the gist of them intelligible to each other in writing, though many grammatical words and much vocabulary differs. However, in the 1950s the written language diverged even for Mandarin when the People's Republic of China introduced simplified characters, which are now used throughout the country. Traditional characters remain the norm in Taiwan and some overseas communities.

=== Hindi ===
A number of dialects and languages are classified as Hindi dialects, which is a social rather than linguistic concept. Standard Hindi (and Standard Urdu) are based on Khari Boli, the dialect spoken around Delhi. Other dialects with high mutual intelligibility spoken in surrounding areas include Haryanvi and languages from Western Uttar Pradesh, like Braj Bhasha. But many languages less similar to Standard Hindi, and that do not have official status under the 8th Schedule to the Constitution of India, are classified as dialects of Hindi. This includes Bhojpuri, spoken in Eastern Uttar Pradesh and Bihar, which is objectively a distinct language. Over time, more and more languages have been recognized as distinct from Hindi, and so are no longer considered Hindi dialects: Maithili was made a scheduled language of India in 2003, and Chhattisgarhi was made official in Chhattisgarh.

== See also ==
- Accent perception
- Chronolect
- Colloquialism
- Creole language
- Dialect levelling
- Dialectology
- Dialectometry
- Ethnolect
- Eye dialect
- Idiolect
- Isogloss
- Koiné language
- Literary language
- Nation language
- Regional language
- Register (sociolinguistics)
- Sprachbund

=== Selected list of articles on dialects ===
- Albanian dialects
- Varieties of Arabic
- Bengali dialects
- Catalan dialects
- Varieties of Chinese
- Cypriot Greek
- Cypriot Turkish
- Danish dialects
- Dutch dialects
- Dialects of English (list)
- Finnish dialects
- Varieties of French
- Georgian dialects
- German dialects
- Connacht Irish, Munster Irish, Ulster Irish
- Regional Italian
- Japanese dialects
- Korean dialects
- Malayan languages
- Malayalam languages
- Norwegian dialects
- Nguni languages
- Dialects of Polish
- Portuguese dialects
- Romanian dialects
- Russian dialects
- Slavic microlanguages
- Slovenian dialects
- Spanish dialects
- Sri Lankan Tamil dialects
- Swedish dialects
- Yiddish dialects
