= Chronolect =

Language variants linked to temporal conditions

In linguistics, a chronolect or temporal dialect is a specific speech variety whose characteristics are in particular determined by time-related factors. As such, it can be contrasted with a sociolect, an ethnolect or a geolect. In historical linguistics, a chronolect is set more or less equal to a specific language stage. Many chronolects are extinct or endangered.

The term has been used to describe newly formed political proverbs in Nigeria.

== See also ==
- Historical language
- Classical language
- Dialect
- Language evolution
