= William Alexander Stewart =

American linguist

- Born: September 12, 1930; Honolulu, Hawaii, United States
- Died: March 25, 2002 (aged 71); Manhattan, New York, United States
- Scientific career
- Fields: Creoles, sociolinguistics

William Alexander Stewart (September 12, 1930 – March 25, 2002) was an American linguist specializing in creoles, known particularly for his work on African American Vernacular English.

== Biography ==
Stewart was born in Honolulu, Hawaii to Scottish parents, and grew up speaking four languages (English, Spanish, Portuguese and Hawaiian). At the age of 8, he moved with his family to California. His parents were killed in a car crash one year later, and he was raised by his father's parents. In 1952, he was drafted into the United States Army and served in Paris, France and Frankfurt, Germany as a translator. He became a corporal. After his army service, he enrolled at the University of California, Los Angeles, where he obtained his Bachelor's and Master's degrees. He was on the faculty of the Graduate Center of the City University of New York for over 25 years.

== Work ==
Working for the Center for Applied Linguistics, Stewart undertook pioneering work on creoles in the Caribbean in the early 1960s. In 1965, he discovered that reading problems of some African-American children were caused not by vocabulary or pronunciation, but by differences between the grammar of African American Vernacular English and standard English. In the late 1960s, he explored the sociolinguistics of multilingualism, introducing the notions of polycentric languages, autonomy and heteronomy.

== See also ==
- Standard language
- Language planning
- Post-creole continuum
- Monogenetic theory of pidgins
- List of diglossic regions
