= Abdi Qays =

Personal details
- Born: Abdi Aadan Haad عبدي آدن حاد; 1948 (age 77–78) Hargeisa, British Somaliland

Abdi Aden Haad (Somali: Cabdi Aadan Xaad) , as known as Abdi Qays (Somali: Cabdi Qays), is a Somali poet and musician.

== Biography ==
=== Early days ===
Around 1948, Abdi Qays was born in Hagal, on the western outskirts of Hargeisa. He was raised in Hargeisa and studied the Quran and Arabic at the Shiikh Baraawe School. He has known Muse Bihi Abdi since they were young, and in a 2016 interview, he recounted that he once sold one of his favorite T-shirts to help Muse Bihi cover his food expenses on a trip to Lawyacado.

In the 1960s, he began his musical career and received support from figures such as famous poet Sahardid Mahamed Jebiye. He worked as an oud player. In 1963, he wrote his first song and submitted it to Radio Hargeisa. The song, titled “Hooy hooy habawsaneey,” (Hey you, the strayed one) also known as “Beel hayaantiyo adhay horaysaa,” was performed by Hibo Mohamed and Osman Hacanlaw.

=== Djibouti ===
In 1966, he accompanied his older brother, Abdilahi Adan, and moved to Djibouti with a play he had written in Hargeisa. There, he became an actor. He appeared in the play "Layla and Majnun" there, playing the lead role of Qays ibn al-Mulawwah, which is why he came to be known as Qays.

=== Hargeisa ===
He lived in Hargeisa in the 1970s.

=== Mogadishu ===
In 1978, he moved to Mogadishu.

Abdi Qays served in prison because of the political messages against the Siad Barre regime in his songwriting and poetry.

After his release from prison, Abdi Qays became deeply devoted to Sufism and sang his own qasidas. Abdi Qays was in contact with top government officials in Mogadishu, and some SNM supporters were suspicious of him. He had ties with the politician Ismail Ali Abokor, and went into hiding after Ismail was arrested in 1982 as a political prisoner.

In 1988, He released a new song titled “Waxba iila maad hadhin” (“You Left Me Nothing”). This song became a hit after being performed by Saado Ali Warsame and Khadra Dahir Ige. In particular, he often performed with Khadra Dahir, with her singing and him playing the oud.

=== After Somaliland's independence ===
In the early 2000s, Abdi Qays traveled to the holy city of Mecca for the Hajj and Umrah, and then set out for Medina. He experienced extremely harsh weather conditions along the way, and in 2005, he used that as inspiration to release the qasida "Intay Dhagax Ku Tureen." Cabdiraxmaan Saqraan composed the music for this poem, and Sheekh Cabdiraxmaan Dandaawi sang it, turning it into a hit.

In December 2014, he published his autobiography and poetry collection, "DARMAAN IYO DALXIIS", and received congratulations from many people, including Muse Bihi Abdi and former Somaliland President.

In 2015, it has been reported that he was living in Hargeisa.

In April 2016, he gave an interview to a newspaper, in which he briefly described his background and said he was content to be in Hargeisa, where he is now free from anyone’s control.

In February 2018, the Somaliland government suspended the payment of a monthly allowance of approximately US$500 to poets Hadrawi, Hassan Ganey, and Abdi Qays. Former President Silanyo had been providing this allowance for the past eight months. At the time, Abdi Qays was battling an illness in Hargeisa.

In September 2019, an event celebrating the publication of the biography of Abdi Qays, Geedigii Abwaan Cabdi Qays, was held in the city of Hargeisa, attended by hundreds of Somaliland citizens, including prominent poets, artists, and politicians representing Somaliland.

In July 2021, Abdi Qays performed a reading of a traditional Somali epic poem at an exhibition event held as part of the Hargaysa International Book Fair.

== Reviews by Celebrities ==
- Boobe Yusuf Duale, a writer and former Minister of Information of Somaliland, described him as "a man blessed by God with a passion for the arts."
- Hadrawi, a poet who was imprisoned at the same time as him, described him as "a kind-hearted and deeply compassionate person who is not the type to lie."
- Muse Bihi Abdi, a former Somali President, shared an anecdote, saying, "He was very generous; although he opened a restaurant in Hargeisa, he often served food to customers for free, which led to the restaurant going out of business and leaving him in debt."

== Family ==
Abdi Qays was once married to singer Amina Abdullahi Hirsi, and they have children together.
