= Sociolect =

Language variety or register peculiar to a specific social class

In sociolinguistics, a sociolect is a form of language (non-standard dialect, restricted register) or a set of lexical items used by a socioeconomic class, profession, age group, or other social group.

Sociolects involve both passive acquisition of particular communicative practices through association with a local community as well as active learning and choice among speech or writing forms to demonstrate identification with particular groups. The term sociolect might refer to socially restricted dialects, but it is sometimes also treated as equivalent with the concept of register or used as a synonym for jargon and slang.

Sociolinguists—people who study sociolects and language variation—define a sociolect by examining the social distribution of specific linguistic terms. For example, a sociolinguist would examine the use of the second person pronoun you within a given population. If one distinct social group used yous as the plural form of the pronoun, then this could indicate the existence of a sociolect. A sociolect is distinct from a regional dialect (regiolect) because social class, rather than geographical subdivision, substantiates the unique linguistic features.

== Overview ==
A sociolect, defined by leading sociolinguist and philosopher Peter Trudgill, is "a variety or lect which is thought of as being related to its speakers' social background rather than geographical background." This idea of a sociolect began with the commencement of dialectology, the study of different dialects in relation to society, which has been established in countries such as England for many years, but only recently has the field garnered more attention. However, as opposed to a dialect, the basic concept of a sociolect is that a person speaks in accordance with their social group whether it is with regard to one's ethnicity, age, gender, etc. As William Labov once said, "the sociolinguistic view ... is that we are programmed to learn to speak in ways that fit the general pattern of our communities." Therefore, what we are surrounded with in our environment determines how we speak; hence, our actions and associations.

== Distinguished from dialect ==
The main distinction between sociolects (social dialects) and dialects proper (geographical dialects), which are often confused, is the settings in which they are created. A dialect's main identifier is geography: a certain region uses specific phonological, morphosyntactic or lexical rules. Asif Agha expands the concept by stating that "the case where the demographic dimension marked by speech are matters of geographic provenance alone, such as speaker's birth locale, extended residence and the like". However, a sociolect's main identifier is a socioeconomic class, age, gender, and/or ethnicity in a certain speech community.

An example of a dialectal difference, based on region, is the use of the words soda or pop and coke in different parts of the United States. As Thomas E. Murray states, "coke is used generically by thousands of people, especially in the southern half of the country." On the other hand, pop is known to be a term that is used by many citizens in the northern half of the country.

An example of a sociolect difference, based on social grouping, is the zero copula in African American Vernacular English. It occurs in a specific ethnic group but in all areas of the United States. William Labov gives an example: "he here" instead of "he's here."

== Definitions ==
Code switching is "the process whereby bilingual or bidialectal speakers switch back and forth between one language or dialect and another within the same conversation".

Diglossia, associated with the American linguist Charles A. Ferguson, which describes a sociolinguistic situation such as those that obtain in Arabic-speaking countries and in German-speaking Switzerland. In such a diglossic community, the prestigious standard of 'High' (or H) variety, which is linguistically related to but significantly different from the vernacular or 'Low' (or L) varieties, has no native speakers.

Domain is "different language, dialects, or styles are used in different social contexts".

Language attitudes are "social in origin, but that they may have important effects on language behavior, being involved in acts of identity, and on linguistic change."

Linguistic variable is "a linguistic unit...initially developed...in order to be able to handle linguistics variation. Variables may be lexical and grammatical, but are most often phonological". Example of British English (h) which is sometimes present and sometimes not.

Pragmatics is the meaning of a word in social context, while semantics has "purely linguistic meaning".

Register is "a language variety that is associated with a particular topic, subject, or activity...." Usually, it is defined by vocabulary, but has grammatical features as well.

== Examples ==
=== Tamil caste system ===
The following is an example of the lexical distinction between the Mudaliyar and the Iyengar groups of the Tamil-speaking people in India. The Iyengar group is part of the Brahmin caste which is scholarly and higher in the caste hierarchy than the non-Brahmin or Mudaliyar, caste. The Mudaliyars use many of the same words for things that are differentiated within the Iyengars' speech. For example, as seen below, the difference between drinking water, water in general, and non-potable water is used by one word in the non-Brahmin caste and three separate words in the Brahmin caste. Furthermore, Agha references how the use of different speech reflects a "departure from a group-internal norm". For example, if the non-Brahmin caste uses Brahmin terms in their mode of speech it is seen as self-raising, whereas if people within the Brahmin caste use non-Brahmin speech it is seen as pejoratives. Therefore, depending on which castes use certain words the pragmatics change. Hence, this speech system is determined by socioeconomic class and social context.

Gloss	Mudaliyar (non-Brahmin)	Iyengar (Brahmin)
Drinking water	tanni	tirrto
Water in general	tanni	jalo
Non-potable water	tanni	tanni
Worship	puuse	puuje
Food	sooru	saado
Worship	puuse	puuje 'worship'// puuse 'punishment for children'
Food	sooru/saado	saado 'food'// sooru 'food' (pejorative)
Eat	tinnu/saapdo	saapdo 'eat'// tinnu 'guzzle, etc.' (pejorative)

=== Norwegian dialect-based sociolect ===
Norwegian does not have a spoken standard and is heavily dependent on dialect variants. The following example shows the difference between the national written standard and a spoken variant, where the phonology and pronunciation differ. These are not sociolectic differences per se. As Agha states, "Some lexical contrasts are due to the phonological difference (e.g., R makes more consonantal and vocalic distinctions than B), while others are due to the morphological difference (e.g., difference in plural suffixes and certain verb inflections) between two varieties.

Gloss	National standard (Bokmål, B)	Local variety (Ranamål, R)
I	Jeg	Eg
you	Deg	Deg
He	Han	Hanj
She	Hun	Ho
If	Hvis	Vess
To, toward	Til	Tell
Who	Hvem	Kem
How	Hvordan	Korsen

=== Diglossia ===
The chart below gives an example of diglossia in Arabic-speaking nations and where it is used. Diglossia is defined by Mesthrie as "[a] situation where two varieties of a language exist side by side". Classical Arabic is known as al-fuṣḥā (الفصحى), while the colloquial dialect depends on the country. For example, šāmi (شامي) is spoken in Lebanon and parts of Syria. In many situations, there is a major lexical difference among words in the classical and colloquial speech, as well as pronunciation differences, such as a difference in short vowels, when the words are the same. Although a specific example of diglossia was not given, its social context is almost if not more important. For example, Halliday states that "in areas with Diglossia, the link between language and success is apparent as the higher, classical register is learned through formal education".

	H	L
Sermon in church or mosque	X	
Instructions to servants, waiters, workmen, clerks, etc.		X
Personal letter		X
Speech in parliament, political speech	X	
University lecture	X	
Conversation with family, friends, colleagues		X
News broadcast	X	
Radio soap opera		X
Newspaper editorial, news story, caption on picture		X
Caption on political cartoon		X
Poetry	X	
Folk literature		X

=== African American Vernacular English (AAVE) ===
Below is an example of African American Vernacular English, showing the addition of the verbal -s not just on third-person singular verbs in the present tense such as in Standard American English, but added onto infinitives, first-person present verbs, and third-person past perfect verbs.

1. He can goes out.
2. I don't know how to gets no girls.
3. He'd knows that.

Further examples of the phenomenon in AAVE are provided below.

Below are examples of the lack of the possessive ending; -s is usually absent in AAVE but contains a rule As Labov states, "[the] use -s to indicate possession by a single noun or pronoun, but never between the possessor and the possessed."

"This is hers, This is mines, This is John's, but not in her book, my book, John book"

"Interview with Bryan A., seven years old, a struggling reader in a West Philadelphia elementary school:

1. If I don't get out my mom room, I get in trouble and when I don't get out my sister room she hit me.
2. Bernicia penpal gave me one.
3. That's what he did to my cousin Raymond dog at my cousin house.
4. I was acting like I stole my sister food.
5. At the museum, it was fun, we went in somebody heart."

== Effects ==
=== Code-switching ===
Many times within communities that contain sociolects that separate groups linguistically it is necessary to have a process where the independent speech communities can communicate in the same register; even if the change is as simple as different pronunciation. Therefore, the act of code-switching becomes essential. Code-switching is defined as "the process whereby bilingual or bidialectal speakers switch back and forth between one language or dialect and another within the same conversation". At times code-switching can be situational, depending on the situation or topical, depending on the topic. Halliday terms this the best when he defines the role of discourse, stating that "it is this that determines, or rather correlates with, the role played by the language activity in the situation". Therefore, meaning that which register is used depends on the situation and lays out the social context of the situation, because if the wrong register is used, then the wrong context is placed on the words. Furthermore, referring back to the diglossia expressed in the Arab-speaking world and the Tamil caste system in India, which words are used must be appropriate to not only the social class of the speaker, but the situation, the topic, and the need for courtesy. A more comprehensive definition is stated, "Code-switching is not only a definition of the situation but an expression of social hierarchy."

== See also ==
- Argot
- Christianese
- Chronolect
- Creole language
- Idiolect
- Jargon
- Language and gender
- Pidgin
- Prestige (sociolinguistics)
- Shibboleth
- Slang
