= Societad Retorumantscha =

The Societad Retorumantscha (Romansh Society, SRR) is the oldest language association devoted to the promotion of the Romansh language.

Established in 1885, its seat is in Chur.

It bears the responsibility of publishing the Dicziunari Rumantsch Grischun.
