= A language is a dialect with an army and navy =

Facetious characterization of dialect

"A language is a dialect with an army and navy", sometimes called the Weinreich witticism, is a mordant aphorism about the arbitrariness of the distinction between a dialect and a language. It was originally said in the context of the "social plight of Yiddish", and has been widely adopted as a shorthand for the importance of social and political conditions, rather than purely linguistic considerations, in defining the status of a language or dialect. The witticism was popularized by the sociolinguist and Yiddish scholar Max Weinreich, who heard it from a member of the audience at one of his lectures in the 1940s. A more scholarly approach to the problem of dialect versus language is the framework of abstand and ausbau languages.

== Weinreich ==
This statement is usually attributed to Max Weinreich, a specialist in Yiddish linguistics, who expressed it in Yiddish:

אַ שפּראַך איז אַ דיאַלעקט מיט אַן אַרמיי און פֿלאָט
a shprakh iz a dyalekt mit an armey un flot

The earliest known published source is Weinreich's article "Der YIVO un di problemen fun undzer tsayt" (דער ייִוואָ און די פּראָבלעמען פֿון אונדזער צײַט; lit. "The YIVO and the problems of our time"), originally presented as a speech on 5 January 1945 at the annual YIVO conference. Weinreich did not give an English version.

In the article, Weinreich presents this statement as a remark of an auditor at a lecture series given between 13 December 1943 and 12 June 1944:

A teacher at a Bronx high school once appeared among the auditors. He had come to America as a child and the entire time had never heard that Yiddish had a history and could also serve for higher matters. ... Once after a lecture he approached me and asked, "What is the difference between a dialect and language?" I thought that the maskilic contempt had affected him, and tried to lead him to the right path, but he interrupted me: "I know that, but I will give you a better definition. A language is a dialect with an army and navy." From that very time I made sure to remember that I must convey this wonderful formulation of the social plight of Yiddish to a large audience.

In his lecture, he discusses not just linguistic, but also broader notions of "yidishkeyt" (ייִדישקייט; lit. Jewishness).

The sociolinguist and Yiddish scholar Joshua Fishman suggested that he might have been the auditor at the Weinreich lecture. However, Fishman was assuming that the exchange took place at a conference in 1967, more than twenty years later than the YIVO lecture (1945) and in any case does not fit Weinreich's description above.

== Other mentions ==
Some scholars believe that Antoine Meillet had earlier said that a language is a dialect with an army, but there is no contemporary documentation of this.

Jean Laponce noted in 2004 that the phrase had been attributed in "la petite histoire" (essentially anecdote) to Hubert Lyautey (1854–1934) at a meeting of the Académie Française; Laponce referred to the adage as "la loi de Lyautey" ('Lyautey's law').

Randolph Quirk adapted the definition to "A language is a dialect with an army and a flag".

== Antecedents ==
In 1589, George Puttenham had made a similar comment about the political nature of the definition of a language as opposed to a language variety: "After a speech is fully fashioned to the common understanding, and accepted by consent of a whole country and nation, it is called a language".

== See also ==
- Dialect continuum
- Language secessionism
