= Heteronomous annulation =

Heteronomous annulation is a characteristic of some arthropods. It means that segments are differentiated from one another, each having different form so as to serve a different function – for instance, using some limbs for walking and others for feeding.

The trait is first observed in the armoured lobopods. It is thought to be the precursor to segmentation in arthropods, and perhaps resulted from the need to produce serially repeated defensive structures (spines). It can be studied using homeotic genes. It is believed to be a trait found in the most recent common ancestor of Panarthropoda.
