= Autonomy and heteronomy =

Functional relationships between related language varieties

Autonomy and heteronomy are complementary attributes of a language variety describing its functional relationship with related varieties. The concepts were introduced by William A. Stewart in 1968, and provide a way of distinguishing a language from a dialect.

== Definitions ==
A variety is said to be autonomous if it has an independent cultural status. This may occur if the variety is structurally different from all others, a situation Heinz Kloss called abstand. Thus language isolates such as Basque are necessarily autonomous. Where several closely related varieties are found together, a standard language is autonomous because it has its own orthography, dictionaries, grammar books and literature. In the terminology of Heinz Kloss, these are the attributes of ausbau, or the elaboration of a language to serve as a literary standard.

A variety is said to be heteronomous with respect to a genetically related standardized variety if speakers read and write the other variety, which they consider the standard form of their speech, and any standardizing changes in their speech are toward that standard. In such cases, the heteronomous variety is said to be dependent on, or oriented toward, the autonomous one. In the terminology of Heinz Kloss, the heteronomous varieties are said to be under the "roof" of the standard variety. For example, the various regional varieties of German (so called "dialects"), such as Alemannic, Austro-Bavarian, Central, Eastern, and Northern Hessian, Kölsch, Low German, and more, are heteronomous with respect to Standard German, even though many of them are not mutually intelligible.

Local dialects of the West Germanic continuum are oriented toward either Standard Dutch or Standard German depending on which side of the border they are spoken. Bordering dialects are generally mutually intelligible, despite their orientation to either standardized variety.

A dialect continuum may be partitioned by these dependency relationships, which are often determined by extra-linguistic factors. For example, although Germanic varieties spoken on either side of the Dutch–German border are very similar, those spoken in the Netherlands are oriented toward Standard Dutch, whereas those spoken in Germany are oriented toward Standard German.

Within this framework, a language may be defined as an autonomous variety together with all the varieties that are heteronomous with respect to it. Stewart noted that an essentially equivalent definition had been stated by Charles A. Ferguson and John J. Gumperz in 1960. In these terms, Danish and Norwegian, though mutually intelligible to a large degree, are considered separate languages. Conversely, although the varieties of Chinese are mutually unintelligible and have significant differences in phonology, syntax and vocabulary, they may be viewed as comprising a single language because they are all heteronomous with respect to Standard Chinese. Similarly, a heteronomous variety may be considered a dialect of a language defined in this way.

== Change of status ==
Autonomy and heteronomy are largely sociopolitical constructs rather than the result of intrinsic linguistic differences, and thus may change over time.

Heteronomous varieties may become dependent on a different standard as a result of social or political changes. For example, the Scanian dialects spoken at the southern tip of Sweden, were considered dialects of Danish when the area was part of the kingdom of Denmark. A few decades after the area was transferred to Sweden, these varieties were generally regarded as dialects of Swedish, although the dialects themselves had not changed.

Efforts to achieve autonomy are often connected with nationalist movements and the establishment of nation states. An example of a variety that has gained autonomy is Afrikaans, which was formerly considered a dialect of Dutch. Sometimes it is stated that examples of varieties that have gained autonomy include Serbian, Croatian, and Bosnian, but "the four varieties - Bosnian, Croatian, Montenegrin, and Serbian - are all totally mutually comprehensible [...] What there is, is a common, polycentric standard language - just like, say, French, which has Belgian, Swiss, French, and Canadian variants but is definitely not four different languages. [...] Linguistic scientists are agreed that BCSM is essentially a single language with four different standard variants bearing different names".

Examples of languages that have previously been considered to be autonomous but are now sometimes considered heteronomous are Occitan, sometimes considered a dialect of French; Low German, occasionally considered to be a dialect of German; and Scots with regard to Standard English, though the German linguist Heinz Kloss considered Scots a Halbsprache ('half language') in terms of an abstand and ausbau languages framework due to its prestigious literary conventions as, for example, described in the 1921 Manual of Modern Scots.

== See also ==
- Abstand and ausbau languages
- "A language is a dialect with an army and navy"
- Language secessionism
