= Abstand and ausbau languages =

Relationships among standard and other languages

In sociolinguistics, an abstand language is a language variety or cluster of varieties with significant linguistic distance from all others, while an ausbau language is a standard variety, possibly with related dependent varieties. Heinz Kloss introduced these terms in 1952 to denote two separate and largely independent sets of criteria for recognizing a "language":

- one based on linguistic properties compared to related varieties (German: Abstand, IPA: [ˈʔapˌʃtant], "distance")
- the other based on sociopolitical functions (German: Ausbau, IPA: [ˈʔaʊsˌbaʊ], "expansion")

This framework addresses situations in which multiple varieties from a dialect continuum have been standardized, so that they are commonly considered distinct languages even though they may be mutually intelligible. The continental Scandinavian languages offer a commonly cited example of this situation. One of the applications of this theoretical framework is language standardization (examples since the 1960s including Basque and Romansh).

== Abstand languages ==
Abstandsprache means "language by virtue of linguistic distance". Kloss suggested the English translation "language by distance", referring to linguistic differences rather than geographical separation. Abstand means a distance of ongoing separation, e.g. a clearance by mechanical design. In the context of language varieties, abstand indicates the discontinuity of two dialects; in the words of Kloss, there is a "definite break" between the varieties.

An abstand language is a cluster of varieties that is distinctly separate from any other language. European examples include Basque and Breton. Kloss also spoke of degrees of abstand between pairs of varieties. He did not specify how the differences between two varieties would be measured, assuming that linguists would apply objective criteria. A standard linguistic criterion is mutual intelligibility, though this does not always produce consistent results, for example when applied to a dialect continuum.

An abstand language does not need to have a standard form. This is often the case with minority languages used within a larger state, where the minority language is used only in private, and all official functions are performed in the majority language.

== Ausbau languages ==
The German verb ausbauen (pronounced [ˈaʊ̯sˌbaʊ̯ən], literally "to build out") expresses core meanings of "expanding" something or "developing something to completion", e.g. adding to an existing structure. (Croatian linguist Žarko Muljačić translated Ausbausprache into French as langue par élaboration.) Kloss suggested the English translation "language by development", referring to the development of a standard variety from part of a dialect continuum:

Languages belonging in this category are recognized as such because of having been shaped or reshaped, molded or remolded—as the case may be—in order to become a standardized tool of literary expression.

Kloss identified several stages of this development, beginning with use of the variety for humour or folklore, followed by lyrics and then narrative prose. The next phase, which he considered crucial, was use of the variety for serious non-fiction. From this point, the variety could be further developed for use in technical, scientific or government domains.

A standard variety developed in this way can be mutually intelligible with other standard varieties. A commonly cited example occurs in the Scandinavian dialect continuum spanning Norway, Sweden and Denmark. The three standardized languages Norwegian, Swedish and Danish (or four if Norwegian Bokmål and Nynorsk are distinguished) are mutually distinct ausbau languages, even though speakers of the different standards can, to varying degrees, readily understand one another.

This classification invokes the criterion of social and political functions of language use. The sociolinguist Peter Trudgill has linked Kloss's theoretical framework with Einar Haugen's framework of autonomy and heteronomy, with the statement that a variety is an ausbau language corresponding to the statement that it is used "autonomously" with respect to other related languages. Such a language has an independent cultural status, even though it may be mutually intelligible with other ausbau languages from the same continuum. This typically means that it has its own standardized form independent of neighbouring standard languages, it is typically taught in schools, and it is used as a written language in a wide variety of social and political functions, possibly including that of an official national language. In contrast, varieties that are not ausbau languages are typically only spoken and typically only used in private contexts. Trudgill expands the definition to include related varieties:

[A]n Ausbau language is an autonomous standardized variety together with all the nonstandard dialects from that part of the dialect continuum which are heteronomous with respect to it i.e. dependent on it.

An Ausbau language is defined by social criteria, and hence tend to treat languages as social constructs that can be identified only through its social status and usage. However, the coexistence of abstand and ausbau languages lead to two opposing sets of criteria over the status of nonstandard varieties. For example, various varieties of German and Italian are considered dialects according to Ausbau criteria, although they are linguistically distant from the standard languages.

== Roofing ==
Kloss described an ausbau language as providing a "roof" (German: Dach) over dependent varieties, whereas non-standard varieties without a reference standard were "roofless dialects". He used the term "near-dialectized sister languages" for varieties roofed by a standard variety with which they are related but not mutually intelligible, such as Low Saxon (roofed by Standard German), Occitan and Haitian Creole (roofed by French), and Sardinian (roofed by Italian). A later development is the notion of multiple, pluricentric standards within the same language; for German not one but at least three roofs are offered: Standard German German, Standard Austrian German and Standard Swiss German. These newer conceptualizations, however, may be restricted by "One Standard Axioms", which uphold presuppositions of a single standard, a single "Dach", that exert hegemonic power e.g. the "One Standard German Axiom" (OSGA).

Muljačić introduced the term Dachsprache, or "roofing language", for a dialect that serves as a standard language for other dialects. These dialects would usually be in a dialect continuum, but may be so different that mutual intelligibility is not possible between all dialects, particularly those separated by significant geographical distance. The roofing language may also cover linguistic varieties that are not mutually intelligible with the roofing language, such as in the case of Standard German. In order to resolve the difficulty of partitioning a dialect continuum, Goossens as well as Chambers and Trudgill argue that all nonstandard varieties that are under the roofing language should be considered part of the same language as the roofing language. In 1982, "Rumantsch Grischun" was developed by Heinrich Schmid as such a Dachsprache for a number of quite different Romansh language forms spoken in parts of Switzerland. Similarly, Standard Basque and the Southern Quechua literary standard were both developed as standard languages for dialect continua that had historically been thought of as discrete languages with many dialects and no "official" dialect. Standard German and Italian, to some extent, function in the same way. Perhaps the most widely used Dachsprache is Modern Standard Arabic, which links together the speakers of many different, often mutually unintelligible varieties of Arabic.

The Dachsprache functions together with dialects to form a linguistic diasystem, which consists of different linguistic systems that coexist and mutually influence. Within the diasystem, the Dachsprache functions as the standard for interdialectal communication, for example, with Standard Chinese assisting communication between different dialects and influencing their vocabulary.

== Distance between ausbau languages ==
Kloss recognized three degrees of separation between ausbau languages.

When two standards are based on identical or near-identical dialects, he considered them as splits of the same standard into two or more, constituting a pluricentric language. Examples include British and American Standard English, Standard Austrian German and German Standard German, or European and Brazilian variants of Portuguese. High Hindi and Urdu also have a common dialect basis (Hindustani). The same is the case with Serbian, Croatian, Bosnian and Montenegrin, which also have the same dialect basis (Shtokavian), and consequently constitute four standard variants of the pluricentric Serbo-Croatian language.

Standards created from different dialects, but with little abstand, would not be considered separate abstand languages, but constitute distinct ausbau languages, as noted above for Danish, Swedish and Norwegian. The concept of ausbau is particularly important in cases where the local spoken varieties across a larger region form a dialect continuum. In such cases, the question of where the one language ends and the other starts is often a question more of ausbau than of abstand. In some instances, ausbau languages have been created out of dialects for purposes of nation-building. This applies, for instance, to Luxembourgish vis-a-vis German (the vernaculars in Luxembourg are varieties of Moselle Franconian, which is also spoken in the German sections of the Moselle River valley and neighbouring French département of Moselle). Other examples of groups of vernaculars lacking abstand internally but that have given rise to multiple ausbau languages are: Persian of Iran, Afghanistan and Tajikistan (cf. Farsi, Dari, Tajik); Bulgarian and Macedonian, because they have different dialect bases.

Finally, the ausbau languages may be so different that they also constitute abstand languages. Examples include Dutch versus German, Persian versus Pashto, and Tamil versus Telugu.

In the former two cases, scholars do not always agree on the best classification, as they always partake, inadvertently, in the "language making" and "language unmaking" process. The concept of a One Standard German Axiom in that language is a case in point that illustrates the contested nature of the first two types of ausbau languages and occasionally also the third, varying with the degree with which sociolinguistic processes are assigned relevance in a particular approach.

== Change of roles over time ==
There are several instances of languages and language pairs that have undergone role changes over time. Low German, for instance, was both an Ausbau language and a roof of local dialects in the Netherlands, Germany and parts of the Baltic states and their formerly German vicinity. With the end of the Hanseatic League, Low German lost its status as an official language to a large degree. Approximately at the same time, Dutch started to replace Low German as a roof of the Low German dialects in the Netherlands that form today's Dutch Low Saxon group, and most Central German dialects went under the "roof" of the evolving High German. Low German ceased to be spoken on the eastern rim of the Baltic Sea. Today, its dialects surviving in northern Germany have come under the roof of Standard German. Local Low German dialects spoken in the Netherlands have come under the roof of Dutch. This happened despite the effect of notable migration streams in both directions between the Western (Dutch) and Eastern (Prussian, now mainly Polish and Russian) areas of the region of the Low German languages, motivated by both religious intolerance and labour need. In several spots along the Dutch–German border, identical dialects are spoken on both sides, but are deemed to belong to different roofing according to which side of the border they are on.

== See also ==
- A language is a dialect with an army and navy
- Language secessionism
- Linguistic demography
- Linguistic distance
- Post-creole speech continuum
  - Decreolization
- Register (sociolinguistics)

== Bibliography ==
- Ammon, Ulrich (2004), "Standard Variety", in Wiegand, Herbert Ernst (ed.), Sociolinguistics: An International Handbook of the Science of Language and Society, vol. 1 (2nd ed.), Berlin: deGruyter, pp. 273–283, ISBN 978-3-11-014189-4.
- Chambers, J.K.; Trudgill, Peter (1998), Dialectology (2nd ed.), Cambridge University Press, ISBN 978-0-521-59646-6.
- Goebl, Hans (1989), "Quelques remarques relatives aux concepts Abstand et Ausbau de Heinz Kloss", in Ammon, Ulrich (ed.), Status and function of languages and language varieties, de Gruyter, pp. 278–290, ISBN 978-0-89925-356-5.
- Goltz, Reinhard H.; Walker, Alastair G.H. (2013) [1989], "North Saxon", in Russ, Charles V.J. (ed.), The dialects of modern German: a linguistic survey, London: Routledge, pp. 31–58, ISBN 978-1-136-08676-2.
- Haugen, Einar (1966), "Dialect, Language, Nation", American Anthropologist, 68 (4): 922–935, doi:10.1525/aa.1966.68.4.02a00040, JSTOR 670407.
- —— (1968), "The Scandinavian languages as cultural artifacts", in Fishman, Joshua A.; Ferguson, Charles A; Dasgupta, Jyotirindra (eds.), Language problems of developing nations, Wiley, pp. 267–284, ISBN 978-0-471-26160-5.
- Kloss, Heinz (1952), Die Entwicklung neuer germanischer Kultursprachen von 1800 bis 1950, Munich: Pohl, OCLC 3549152.
- —— (1967), "'Abstand languages' and 'ausbau languages'", Anthropological Linguistics, 9 (7): 29–41, JSTOR 30029461.
- —— (1976), "Abstandsprachen und Ausbausprachen" [Abstand languages and ausbau languages], in Göschel, Joachim; Nail, Norbert; van der Elst, Gaston (eds.), Zur Theorie des Dialekts: Aufsätze aus 100 Jahren Forschung, Zeitschrift für Dialektologie und Linguistik, Beihefte, n.F., Heft 16, Wiesbaden: F. Steiner, pp. 301–322, ISBN 978-3-515-02305-4.
- Kordić, Snježana (2004), "Pro und kontra: 'Serbokroatisch' heute" [Pro and contra: 'Serbo-Croatian' today] (PDF), in Krause Marion; Sappok, Christian (eds.), Slavistische Linguistik 2002: Referate des XXVIII. Konstanzer Slavistischen Arbeitstreffens, Bochum 10.-12. September 2002, Slavistishe Beiträge; vol. 434 (in German), Munich: Otto Sagner, pp. 97–148, ISBN 3-87690-885-X, OCLC 56198470, SSRN 3434516, CROSBI 430499, archived (PDF) from the original on 1 June 2012. (ÖNB).
- Muljačić, Žarko (1993), "Standardization in Romance", in Posner, Rebecca; Green, John N. (eds.), Bilingualism and Linguistic conflict in Romance, Trends in Romance Linguistics and Philology, vol. 5, pp. 77–116, ISBN 978-3-11-011724-0.
- Stellmacher, Dieter (1981), Niederdeutsch: Formen und Forschungen, Germanistische Linguistik, vol. 31, Tübingen: Niemeyer Verlag, ISBN 3-484-10415-5.
- Trudgill, Peter (2004), "Glocalisation and the Ausbau sociolinguistics of modern Europe", in Duszak, A.; Okulska, U. (eds.), Speaking from the margin: Global English from a European perspective, Frankfurt: Peter Lang, pp. 35–49, ISBN 978-0-8204-7328-4.
- Wrede, Adam (1999), Neuer Kölnischer Sprachschatz (12th ed.), Köln: Greven Verlag, ISBN 978-3-7743-0243-3.
