= Heinz Kloss =

German linguist (1904–1987)

Heinz Kloss, also Klosz (30 October 1904 – 13 June 1987) was a German linguist internationally recognised for his post-war work on linguistic pluricentricity and linguistic minorities. Until 1945 he worked, like many philologists and linguists of German at the time, on the linguistic construction of peoples and was entangled in the NS system.

Kloss was born in Halle, Saxony-Anhalt in 1904. He coined the terms "Abstandsprache" and "Ausbausprache" as a contribution to disentangle the incongruent use of the terms dialect and language, which cannot be solved on linguistic grounds alone without a social component.

Kloss had various roles in research institutions in the Third Reich and made career steps during that time. He was, for instance, responsible for summing up publicly available statistical data on the North American Jewish population. One copy of the book was found in Hitler's library, which was entitled Statistics, Media, and Organizations of Jewry in the United States and Canada. Hitler's personal copy of the book was obtained by Library and Archives Canada in 2018 and was restored, digitized and made available to the public in 2019. The text of the book itself, not Hitler's copy, is available online from the Deutsche Nationale Bibliothek.

There is a Heinz Kloss fonds at Library and Archives Canada. The archival reference number is R11623.

== Selected works ==
- —— (1929). Nebensprachen: eine sprachpolitische Studie über die Beziehungen eng Verwandter Sprachgemeinschaften. Wilhelm Braumüller, Universitäts-Verlagsbuchhandlung.
- —— (1940–1942). Das Volksgruppenrecht in den Vereinigten Staaten von Amerika. Essener Verlagsanstalt. (two volumes)
- —— (1967). Abstand languages and Ausbau languages. Vol. 9. pp. 29–41. doi:10.1515/9783110860252.278. ISBN 9783110860252.
- —— (1976). "Abstandsprachen und Ausbausprachen" [Abstand-languages and Ausbau-languages]. In Göschel, Joachim; Nail, Norbert; van der Elst, Gaston (eds.). Zur Theorie des Dialekts: Aufsätze aus 100 Jahren Forschung. Zeitschrift fur Dialektologie and Linguistik, Beihefte, n.F., Heft 16. Wiesbaden: F. Steiner. pp. 301–322. ISBN 978-3-515-02305-4.
- —— (1977). The American Bilingual Tradition. Newberry House. ISBN 978-0-912066-06-6.
