= Prokosch =

Prokosch is a surname. Notable people with the surname include:

- Eduard Prokosch (1876–1938), Austrian-American historical linguist
- Frederic Prokosch (1906–1989), American writer (son of Eduard Prokosch)
- Gertrude Prokosch Kurath (1903–1992), American dancer and ethnomusicologist (daughter of Eduard Prokosch)
