= Diasystem =

System for contrasting related languages or dialects

In the field of dialectology, a diasystem or polylectal grammar (Note: Although referentially synonymous, each term can carry different theoretical assumptions; Wolfram (1982:3) also lists overall pattern) is a linguistic analysis set up to encode or represent a range of related (Note: Some scholars use "related" in a far broader sense than others. For example, De Schutter (2010:73) applies diasystem to "the complete set of varieties (diachronic as well as diatopic-synchronic) supposed to derive from one ancestor.") varieties in a way that displays their structural differences.

The term diasystem was coined by linguist and dialectologist Uriel Weinreich in a 1954 paper as part of an initiative in exploring how to extend advances in structuralist linguistic theory to dialectology to explain linguistic variation across dialects. Weinreich's paper inspired research in the late 1950s to test the proposal. However, the investigations soon showed it to be generally untenable, at least under structuralist theory. With the advent of generative theory in the 1960s, researchers tried applying a generative approach in developing diasystemic explanations; this also fell short.

According to some leading sociolinguists, the diasystem idea for incorporating variation into linguistic theory has been superseded by William Labov's notion of the linguistic variable. As such, the concept has not been part of any substantial linguistic theory and the term has limited currency in linguistics.

== Origin of the concept ==
Trubetzkoy (1931) first suggested comparing accents by their synchronic states, rather than by comparing their different historical developments. He classified sound differences between dialects into three types:

- Phonological: the inventory phonemes and contextual restrictions, which may vary between dialects. For example, speakers of Castilian Spanish have the phonemes /θ/ and /s/, whereas Western Hemisphere dialects of Spanish have just the latter.
- Phonetic: how phonemes are realized phonetically. For example, most dialects of English have strongly aspirated /p t k/ in words like park, tool, and cat, but some Northern English accents do not feature such aspiration.
- Etymological distribution: (Note: Starting with Kurath, other scholars have used the term incidence for this.) the distribution of phonemes among member words in an interdialectal lexical correspondence set. For example, most English varieties contrast /æ/ and /ɑː/, but some use the former in words like bath and grass and others use the latter.

Despite Trubetzkoy's proposal, linguists continued to consider variation between varieties outside of the scope of inquiry of grammar construction; each variety, in their thinking, should only be studied on its own terms.

Inspired by Trubetzkoy, Weinreich (1954) proposed a synthesis of linguistic geography and descriptive linguistics by applying the structuralist concept of grammar to the description of regular correspondences between different varieties; a resulting supergrammar, which he called a diasystem, would be consistent with the individual grammars of all the member dialects. A diasystem is a higher order system and its component units of analysis would accordingly be abstractions of a higher order than the units of analysis of the individual systems. That is, just as the phones present within an individual variety are grouped together into abstract phonemes, the phonemes present within a group of varieties could be grouped together into even more abstract diaphonemes. Weinreich exemplified the diasystemic approach by a formulaic arrangement of phoneme correspondences in three dialects of Yiddish, focusing on the vowels but arguing that the principle could work for other aspects of language.

Although Weinreich did not elaborate the diasystemic approach, he did consider some theoretical pitfalls to be avoided. He recognized that phonemic mergers and splits with dissimilar results across dialects would pose a difficult challenge for the construction of a diasystem; he cautioned against positing a diasystem when the work of creating all the member systems (e.g. the work of phonemicization) was yet incomplete; and, following the lead of Trubetzkoy (1931), he noted that the differences in phonological inventory and etymological distribution might prove problematic in the construction of diasystems.

== Subsequent investigation ==
A few linguists took up Weinreich's challenge (Note: Francis (1983:165–166) quotes extensively from Francescato (1965a) and Francescato (1965b).) and quickly found it to be inadequate. Some of the failures had been anticipated by Weinreich himself, as described above.

Moulton (1960) found an extreme example of divergent incidence in a study of two dialects of Swiss German, Luzerner and Appenzeller, which evolved independently of each other. Although each dialect had the same set of eleven short vowel phonemes, only one pair (/i/ ~ /i/) was shown to have a common parent vowel in earlier stages of German. The remaining phonetic similarities between the Luzerner and Appenzeller phoneme sets were fortuitous results of multiple mergers and splits that each dialect underwent separately.

Pulgram (1964), examining Cochrane (1959) and Moulton (1960), noted the need for refinements in the original proposal; different researchers did not seem to agree on definitions, disciplines of study, or objects of inquiry. The research and debate concluded that multiple dialects could not be described by a common grammar, at least not under structuralist theory. That is, it would be unfeasible to construct a single grammar for multiple dialects unless their differences were very minor or if it incorporated only a small number of dialects.

Related to Weinreich's proposal were efforts in both American dialectology and generative phonology to construct an "overall system" that represented the underlying representation for all dialects of English.

An example of this was the diaphonemic analysis, (Note: Weinreich argued that Trager & Smith (1951) fell short in constructing an accurate diasystem because the relevant component phonemic systems had not been established yet. Similarly, Stockwell (1959:265–6), argues that their analysis is not truly diaphonemic because it includes oppositions without considering the effects of phonetic context.) made by Trager & Smith (1951), that presumably all American varieties could fit.

	Front	Central	Back
High	i	ɨ	u
Mid	e	ə	o
Low	æ	a	ɔ

Six of the nine simple vowels in this diasystem are common across most dialects: /i/ occurs in pit, /e/ in pet, /æ/ in pat, /ə/ in putt, /u/ in put, and /a/ in pot. The other three are found in specific dialects or dialect groups: /o/ represents the vowel of road in New England varieties; /ɨ/ represents a vowel that often appears in stressed syllables in words like just (when it means 'only'); and /ɔ/ represents the vowel of pot in Southern British and New England dialects.

These nine simple vowels can then be combined with any of three offglides (/j h w/) to make 36 possible complex nuclei. This system was popular amongst American linguists (despite criticism, particularly from Hans Kurath) until Sledd (1966) demonstrated its inadequacy.

The most salient criticism of these broad diasystems was the issue of how cognitively real they are. That is, whether speakers actually have competence in using or understanding the grammatical nuances of multiple varieties. In certain sociolinguistic circumstances, speakers' linguistic repertoire contains multiple varieties. For example, Cadora (1970:15) argues that Modern Literary Arabic is a diasystem of various interference phenomena occurring when speakers of different Arabic varieties attempt to speak or read Literary Arabic.

More concretely, Peter Trudgill put forth what he considered to be a cognitively real diasystem in Trudgill (1974), a book-length sociolinguistic study of Norwich. As a critic of Weinreich's original proposal, he approached the concept as a generativist, putting forth a series of rules that could generate any possible output reflected in the diversity and variability of sociologically conditioned linguistic variables. Because most speakers of Norwich could vary their pronunciation of each variable depending on the circumstances in which they are speaking, the diasystem's rules reflected speakers' actual linguistic abilities.

Cognitively real diasystems are not limited to humans. For example, crows are able to distinguish between different calls that prompt others to disperse, assemble, or rescue; these calls show regional variation so that French crows do not understand recorded American calls. Although captive birds show difficulty understanding the calls of birds from nearby regions, those allowed to migrate are able to understand calls from both, suggesting that they have mentally constructed a diasystem that enables them to understand both call systems.

Still, these sorts of "idiosyncratic" grammars differ in degree from broader diasystems, which are much less likely to be part of speakers' linguistic competence. Even Trudgill has argued against their cognitive reality, deeming the concept of a broad diasystem to be a "theoretical dead-end." Although the concept did not withstand scrutiny by research linguists, it nevertheless triggered a surge of academic work that used it in applied linguistics (e.g. for ESL education materials, composition texts for native speakers, basic linguistics texts, and in the application of linguistics to literary criticism). Diasystemic representations are also possible in dictionaries. For example, the Macquarie Dictionary reflects the pronunciation of four phonetically distinct sociolects of Australian English. Because these sociolects are the same phonemically, readers (at least, those from Australia) can interpret the system as representing their own accent.

== See also ==
- Creole continuum
- Dialect continuum

== Works cited ==
- Algeo, John (1988), "Aussie Words", American Speech, 63 (2): 159–163, doi:10.2307/454420, JSTOR 454420
- Allen, Harold B. (1977), "Regional dialects, 1945-1974", American Speech, 52 (3/4): 163–261, doi:10.2307/455241, JSTOR 455241
- Auer, Peter; Di Luzio, Aldo (1988), "Introduction. Variation and convergence as a topic in dialectology and sociolinguistics", in Auer, Peter; Di Luzio, Aldo (eds.), Variation and convergence: studies in social dialectology, Sociolinguistics and language contact, vol. 4, pp. 1–10
- Bailey, Charles-James N. (1972), "The integration of linguistic theory: Internal reconstruction and the comparative method in descriptive analysis", in Stockwell, Robert P.; Macaulay, Ronald K.S. (eds.), Linguistic Change and Generative Theory, Bloomington: Indiana University Press, pp. 22–31
- Ballard, W.L. (1971), "Review: Linguistic change and the Saussurian paradox", American Speech, 46 (3/4): 254–270, doi:10.2307/3087780, JSTOR 3087780
- Bickerton, Derek (1975), "review of The Social Differentiation of English in Norwich by Peter Trudgill", Journal of Linguistics, 11 (2): 299–308, doi:10.1017/s0022226700004631, S2CID 144397602
- Cadora, Frederic J. (1970), "Some linguistic concomitants of contactual factors of urbanization", Anthropological Linguistics, 12 (1): 10–19
- Cadora, Frederic J. (1976), "Contrastive compatibility in some Arabic dialects and their classification", Anthropological Linguistics, 18 (9): 393–407
- Chambers, J. K.; Trudgill, Peter (1998). Dialectology. Cambridge textbooks in linguistics (2nd ed.). Cambridge University Press.
- Cochrane, G. R. (1959). "The Australian English vowels as a diasystem". Word. 15: 69–88. doi:10.1080/00437956.1959.11659684.
- Crystal, David (2011). Dictionary of Linguistics and Phonetics (Sixth ed.). John Wiley & Sons. ISBN 9781444356755.
- De Schutter, Georges (2010), "Dialectology", in Fried, Mirjam; Östman, Jan-Ola; Verscheuren, Jef (eds.), Variation and change: pragmatic perspectives, Handbook of pragmatics highlights, vol. 6, John Benjamins, pp. 73–80
- Francescato, Giuseppe (1965a). "Structural comparison, diasystems, and dialectology". Zeitschrift für romanische philologie. 81: 484–491.
- Francescato, Giuseppe (1965b). "Struttura linguistica e dialetto". In Straka, G. (ed.). Actes du Xe congrès international de linguistique et philologie. Paris: Klincksieck. pp. 1011–1017.
- Francis, Winthrop Nelson (1983). Dialectology: an introduction. Longman linguistics library. Vol. 29. Longman.
- Frings, H.; Frings, M. (1959), "The language of crows", Scientific American, 201 (5): 119–131, Bibcode:1959SciAm.201e.119H, doi:10.1038/scientificamerican1159-119
- King, Robert D. (1969), Historical linguistics and generative grammar, Englewood Cliffs, NJ: Prentice-Hall
- Kurath, Hans (1957), "The binary interpretation of English vowels: A critique", Language, 33 (2): 111–122, doi:10.2307/410723, JSTOR 410723
- Martínez-Celdrán, Eugenio; Fernández-Planas, Ana Ma.; Carrera-Sabaté, Josefina (2003), "Castilian Spanish", Journal of the International Phonetic Association, 33 (2): 255–259, doi:10.1017/S0025100303001373
- McDavid, Raven Jr. (1952). "[untitled review of The Phoneme: Its Nature and Use by Daniel Jones]". Language. 28 (3): 377–386. doi:10.2307/410108. JSTOR 410108.
- Moulton, William G. (1960). "The short vowel systems of Northern Switzerland: a study in structural dialectology". Word. 37: 155–182. doi:10.1080/00437956.1960.11659724.
- Petyt, K. M. (1980). The study of dialect: an introduction to dialectology. The language library. London: A. Deutsch..
- Pulgram, Ernst (1964). "Structural comparison, diasystems, and dialectology". Linguistics. 2 (4): 66–82. doi:10.1515/ling.1964.2.4.66. S2CID 143746333.
- Sebeok, Thomas (1963), "[untitled review]", Language, 39 (3): 448–466, doi:10.2307/411126, JSTOR 411126
- Sledd, James H. (1966), "Breaking, umlaut, and the southern drawl", Language, 42 (1): 18–41, doi:10.2307/411598, JSTOR 411598
- Stockwell, Robert (1959). "Structural dialectology: A proposal". American Speech. 34 (4): 258–268. doi:10.2307/453704. JSTOR 453704.
- Swadesh, Morris (1947), "On the analysis of English syllabics", Language, 23 (2): 137–150, doi:10.2307/410385, JSTOR 410385
- Trager, George L.; Smith, Henry L Jr. (1951). An outline of English structure. Studies in Linguistics occasional papers. Vol. 3. Norman, OK: Battenberg Press.
- Trask, Robert L. (1996). A Dictionary of Phonetics and Phonology. London: Routledge.
- Trubetzkoy, Nikolai (1931), "Phonologie et géographie linguistique", Travaux du Cercle Linguistique de Prague, 4: 228–234
- Trudgill, Peter (1974). The social differentiation of English in Norwich. Cambridge studies in linguistics. Vol. 13. Cambridge University Press.
- Trudgill, Peter (1983), On Dialect: Social and Geographical Perspectives, New York: New York University Press
- Weinreich, Uriel (1954). "Is a structural dialectology possible?". Word. 10 (2–3): 388–400. doi:10.1080/00437956.1954.11659535.
- Wells, John Christopher (1970), "Local accents in England and Wales", Journal of Linguistics, 6 (2): 231–252, doi:10.1017/S0022226700002632, S2CID 143523909
- Wells, John Christopher (1982), Accents of English: An Introduction, Cambridge: Cambridge University Press
- Whorf, Benjamin Lee (1943), "Phonemic analysis of the English of Eastern Massachusetts", SIL, 2: 1–40
- Wolfram, Walt (1982), "Language knowledge and other dialects", American Speech, 57 (1): 3–18, doi:10.2307/455176, JSTOR 455176
