= Kurath =

Kurath (/ˈkjʊəræθ/) is a surname. Notable people with the surname include:

- Gertrude Prokosch Kurath (1903–1992), American dancer
- Hans Kurath (1891–1992), American linguist
