= Diaphoneme =

Concept in dialectology analyzing phonemes across dialects of a language

A diaphoneme is an abstract phonological unit that identifies a correspondence between related sounds of two or more varieties of a language or language cluster. For example, New York may be transcribed phonemically as /nuː ˈjɔrk/ in American English and /njuː ˈjɔːk/ in Received Pronunciation. A diaphonemic transcription such as /njuː ˈjɔrk/ would cover both dialects, as it includes the /j/ absent in American English and the /r/ missing from Received Pronunciation; while neither is described exactly, both are derivable from the diaphonemic transcription.

Diaphonology studies the realization of diaphones across dialects, and is important to evaluate if an orthography is adequate for more than one dialect of a language. In historical linguistics, it is concerned with the reflexes of an ancestral phoneme as a language splits into dialects, such as the modern realizations of Old English /oː/.

The concept goes back to the 1930s. The word diaphone was originally used with the same meaning as diaphoneme, but was later repurposed to refer to any of the particular variants, making the relationship between diaphoneme and diaphone analogous to that between phoneme and allophone.

== Usage ==
The term diaphone first appeared in usage by phoneticians like Daniel Jones and Harold E. Palmer. Jones, who was more interested in transcription and coping with dialectal variation than with how cognitively real the phenomenon is, originally used diaphone to refer to the family of sounds that are realized differently depending on dialect but that speakers consider to be the same; an individual dialect or speaker's realization of this diaphone was called a diaphonic variant. Because of confusion related to usage, Jones later coined the term diaphoneme to refer to his earlier sense of diaphone (the class of sounds) and used diaphone to refer to the variants.

A diaphonemic inventory is a specific diasystem (a term popularized by Uriel Weinreich) that superimposes dialectal contrasts to access all contrasts in all dialects that are included. This consists of a shared core inventory and, when accounting for contrasts not made by all dialects (whether they are historical contrasts that have been lost or innovative ones not made in all varieties), only as many contrasts as are needed. The diaphonemic approach gets away from the assumption that linguistic communities are homogeneous, allows multiple varieties to be described in the same terms (something important for situations where people have abilities in more than one variety), and helps in ascertaining where speakers make diaphonic identifications as a result of similarities and differences between the varieties involved.

The linguistic variable, a similar concept presented by William Labov, refers to features with variations that are referentially identical but carry social and stylistic meaning. This could include phonological, as well as morphological and syntactic phenomena. Labov also developed variable rules analysis, with variable rules being those that all members of a speech community (presumably) possess but vary in the frequency of use. The latter concept met resistance from scholars for a number of reasons including the argument from critics that knowledge of rule probabilities was too far from speakers' competence. Because of these problems, use of variable rules analysis died down by the end of the 1980s. Nevertheless, the linguistic variable is still used in sociolinguistics. For Labov, grouping variants together was justified by their tendency to fluctuate between each other within the same set of words. For example, Labov presented the variants (among New York speakers) of the vowel of bad or dance:

Phonetic value	Score
[ɪə]	1
[ɛə]	2
[æ̝]	3
[æː]	4
[aː]	5
[ɑː]	6

The different phonetic values were assigned numerical values that were then used in an overall score index.

Overdifferentiation is when phonemic distinctions from one's primary language are imposed on the sounds of the second system where they are not required; underdifferentiation of phonemes occurs when two sounds of the second system are not maintained because they are not present in the primary system.

== Dialectology ==
Inspired by Trubetzkoy (1931), Uriel Weinreich first advocated the use of diasystems in structural dialectology, and suggested that such a system would represent a higher level of abstraction that can unite related dialects into a single description and transcription. While phonemic systems describe the speech of a single variety, diaphonemic systems can reflect the contrasts that are not made by all varieties being represented. The way these differ can be shown in an example from northern English varieties; some English varieties (Note: Northern English varieties that have not undergone the pane–pain merger.) contrast the vowel of late (/eː/) with that of wait or eight (/ɛɪ/). Other English varieties (Note: Northern English varieties that have not undergone the wait–weight merger.) contrast the vowel of late or wait (/eː/) with that of eight (/ɛɪ/). This non-overlapping pair of phonemes from two different varieties can be reconciled by positing three different diaphonemes: A first diaphoneme for words like late (⫽e⫽), a second diaphoneme for words like wait (⫽ei⫽), and a third diaphoneme for words like eight (⫽ex⫽).

Words	Phonemes		Diaphonemes
Words	Variety A	Variety B	Diaphonemes
late	/eː/	/eː/	⫽e⫽
wait	/eː/	/ɛɪ/	⫽ei⫽
eight	/ɛɪ/	/ɛɪ/	⫽ex⫽

The desire of building a diasystem to accommodate all English dialects, combined with a blossoming generative phonology, prompted American dialectologists to attempt the construction of an "overall system" of English phonology by analyzing dialectal distinctions as differences in the ordering of phonological rules as well as in the presence or absence of such rules. Bickerton (1973:641) even went so far as to claim that principled description of interdialectal code-switching would be impossible without such rules.

An example of this concept is presented in Saporta (1965:223) with a phonological difference between Castilian and Uruguayan Spanish:

Castilian	Uruguayan	Gloss
[ˈklase]	[ˈklase]	'class'
[ˈklasɛs]	[ˈklasɛ]	'classes'

Without the use of ordered rules, Uruguayan Spanish could be interpreted as having two additional phonemes and morphophonemic vowel alternation with its plural marker. Attempting to construct a diasystem that encodes such a variety would thus represent all Spanish varieties as having seven vowel phonemes (with contrasts only in final position). Due to both varieties having closed allophones of mid vowels in open syllables and open allophones in closed syllables, using ordered rules minimizes the differences so that the underlying form for both varieties is the same and Uruguayan Spanish simply has a subsequent rule that deletes /s/ at the end of a syllable; constructing a diaphonemic system thus becomes a relatively straightforward process. Saporta (1965:220) suggests that the rules needed to account for dialectal differences, even if not psychologically real, may be historically accurate.

The nature of an overall system for English was controversial: the analysis in Trager & Smith (1951) was popular amongst American linguists for a time (in the face of criticism, particularly from Hans Kurath); James Sledd put forth his own diaphonemic system that accommodated Southern American English; both Troike (1971) and Reed (1972) modified the scheme of The Sound Pattern of English by focusing on the diaphoneme, believing that it could address neutralizations better than structuralist approaches; and The Pronunciation of English in the Atlantic States (PEAS) by Kurath and McDavid combined several dialects into one system transcribed in the IPA. More recently, The Cambridge Grammar of the English Language makes use of a diaphonemic transcription of Standard English so that examples can be expressed concisely without favoring any particular accent.

Weinreich (1954) argued that Trager & Smith (1951) fell short in accurately representing dialects because their methodology involved attempting to create a diasystem before establishing the relevant component phonemic systems. Voegelin (1956:122) argues a similar problem occurs in the study of Hopi where transfer of training leads phoneticians to fit features of a dialect under study into the system of dialects already studied.

Beginning with Trubetzkoy (1931) linguists attempting to account for dialectal differences have generally distinguished between three types:

- Phonological: the phonemic inventories and phonotactic restrictions
- Phonetic: how a given phoneme is realized phonetically (RP and Australian English, for example, have almost the same exact phoneme system but with notably different realizations of the vowels). This distinction covers differences in the range of allophonic variation.
- Incidence: one phoneme rather than another occurs in a given word or group of words (such as grass, which has the same vowel of farce in RP but not in GA.)

Wells expanded on this by splitting up the phonological category into "systemic" differences (those of inventory) and "structural" differences (those of phonotactics).

In addition, both Wells and Weinreich mention realizational overlap, wherein the same phone (or a nearly identical one) corresponds to different phonemes, depending on accent. Some examples:

- Autistic in Canadian English overlaps with the way speakers of Received Pronunciation say artistic: [ɑːˈtʰɪstɪk]
- Impossible in General American overlaps with RP impassable: [ɪmˈpɑːsəbl̩]

Hankey (1965:229) notes a similar phenomenon in Western Pennsylvania, where [æɪ] occurs either as the vowel of ashes or as the vowel of tiger but no speaker merges the two vowels (i.e. a speaker who says [ˈæɪʃɪz] will not say [ˈtæɪɡɚ]).

Realizational overlap occurs between the three dialects of Huastec, which have the same phonological system even though cognate words often do not have the same reflexes of this system. For example, while the Central and Potosino dialects both have ch and ts-type sounds, the words they are found in are reversed:

Huastec diaphonemes
Diaphoneme	Word		Otontepec	Central	Potosino
#tʃ	#tʃan	'snake'	tʃan	tʃan	tsan
#tʃʼ	#tʃʼak	'flea'	tʃʼak	tʃʼak	tsʼak
#tʲ	#tʲiθ	'pigweed'	tʲiθ	tsiθ	tʃiθ
#tʲʼ	#tʲʼitʲab	'comb'	tʲʼitʲab	tsʼitsab	tʃʼitʃab

Yuen Ren Chao created a diaphonemic transcription of major Chinese varieties, in both Latin and Chinese character versions, called "General Chinese". It originally (1927) covered the various Wu dialects, but by 1983 had expanded to cover the major dialects of Mandarin, Yue, Hakka, and Min as well. Apart from a few irregularities, GC can be read equally well in any of those dialects, and several others besides.

Quranic Arabic uses a diaphonemic writing system that indicates both the pronunciation in Mecca, the western dialect the Quran was written in, and that of eastern Arabia, the prestige dialect of pre-Islamic poetry. For example, final *aj was pronounced something like [eː] in Mecca, and written ي /j/, while it had merged with [aː] in eastern Arabia and was written as ا /ʔ/. In order to accommodate both pronunciations, the basic letter of Meccan Arabic was used, but the diacritic was dropped: ى. Similarly, the glottal stop had been lost in Meccan Arabic in all positions but initially, so the Meccan letters were retained with the eastern glottal stop indicated with a diacritic hamza.

== Bilingualism ==
Einar Haugen expanded the diaphonic approach to the study of bilingualism, believing diaphones represented the process of interlingual identification wherein sounds from different languages are perceptually linked into a single category. Because interlingual identifications may happen between unrelated varieties, it is possible to construct a diasystem for many different language contact situations, with the appropriateness of such a construction depending on its purpose and its simplicity depending on how isomorphic the phonology of the systems are. For example, the Spanish of Los Ojos (a small village in Rio Arriba County, New Mexico) and the local variety of Southwestern English are fairly isomorphic with each other so a diaphonic approach for such a language contact situation would be relatively straightforward. Nagara (1972) makes use of a diaphonic approach in discussing the phonology of the pidgin English used by Japanese immigrants on Hawaiian plantations.

Both Haugen and Weinreich considered the use of phonemes beyond a single language to be inappropriate when phonemic systems between languages were incommensurable with each other. Similarly, Shen (1952), argues that phonemic representations may lead to confusion when dealing with phonological interference and Nagara (1972:56) remarks that narrow phonetic transcription can be cumbersome, especially when discussing other grammatical features like syntax and morphology. Allophones, which phonemic systems do not account for, may be important in the process of interference and interlingual identifications.

=== Borrowing ===
Similarly, the term diaphone can be used in discussions of cognates that occur in different languages due to borrowing. Specifically, Haugen (1956:46, 67) used the term to refer to phonemes that are equated by speakers cross-linguistically because of similarities in shape and/or distribution. For example, loanwords in Huave having "diaphonic identification" with Spanish include àsét ('oil', from Spanish aceite) and kàwíy ('horse', from Spanish caballo). This perception of sameness with native phonology means that speakers of the borrower language (in this case, Huave) will hear new features from the loaner language (in this case, Spanish) as equivalent to features of their own and substitute in their own when reproducing them. In these interlanguage transfers, when phonemes or phonotactic constraints are too different, more extreme compromises may occur; for example, the English phrase Merry Christmas, when borrowed into Hawaiian, becomes mele kalikimaka.

== Pidgins and creoles ==
The process of diaphonic identification occurs when pidgins are fashioned; although lexical and morphosyntactic patterns are shared, speakers often use the phonological systems of their native language, meaning they must learn to recognize such diaphonic correspondences in the speech of others to facilitate the mutual intelligibility of a working pidgin. Bailey (1971) proposes that rule differences can be used to determine the distance a particular utterance has between a post-creole continuum's acrolectal and basolectal forms. Bickerton (1973:641–642) points out that mesolectal varieties often have features not derivable from such rules.

== Cognitive reality ==
The status of panlectal and polylectal grammars (Note: For the purpose of this article, panlectal grammars are those that encode for all varieties of a language, while polylectal ones encode fewer than that.) has been subject to debate amongst generative phonologists since the 1970s; one of the foremost areas of contention in regards to diaphonemes and diasystems is whether they reflect the actual linguistic competence of speakers. William Labov, although warm to the construction of a panlectal grammar, argued that it should be based in speakers' linguistic competence. Peter Trudgill argues against the formation of diasystems that are not cognitively real and implies that polylectal grammars that are not part of native speakers' competence are illegitimate. Similarly, Wolfram (1982:16) cautions that polylectal grammars are appropriate only when they "result in claims about speaker-hearer's capabilities".

Although no linguists claim that panlectal grammars have psychological validity, and polylectal diasystems are much more likely to be cognitively real for bilingual and bidialectal speakers, speakers of only one dialect or language may still be aware of the differences between their own speech and that of other varieties. Take, for example, the word house, which is pronounced:

- [haʊ̯s] in Buffalo
- [həʊ̯s] in Toronto and Washington, D.C.
- [hæʊ̯s] in Philadelphia
- [hɛʊ̯s] in Charlottesville.

Native speakers are able to compensate for the differences and interpret these as the same word. A similar issue occurs in Chinese. When a "general word" is shared across multiple mutually unintelligible dialects, it is regarded as the same word even though it is pronounced differently depending on a speaker's region. Thus speakers from Beijing and Nanking may pronounce 遍 ('throughout') differently ([pjɛn˥˩] and [pjɛ̃˥˩], respectively), though they still regard the differences as minor and due to unimportant accentual differences. Typically, speakers are not normally able to hear distinctions not made in their own dialect so that, for example, a speaker from the Southern United States who does not distinguish between pin and pen will not hear the distinction when it is produced by speakers of other dialects.

In discussing contextual cues to vowel identifications in English, Rosner & Pickering (1994) note that controlling for dialect is largely unimportant for eliciting identifications when vowels are placed between consonants, possibly because the /CVC/ structure often forms lexical items that can aid in identification; identifying vowels in isolation, which rarely carry such lexical information, must be matched to the listener's set of vowel prototypes with less deviation than in consonantal contexts. In the first chapter of Trudgill (1983), Peter Trudgill makes the case that these semantic contexts form the basis of intelligibility across varieties and that the process is irregular and ad hoc rather than the result of any sort of rule-governed passive polylectal competence.

De Camp (1971) argues that a child's language acquisition process includes developing the ability to accommodate for the different varieties they are exposed to (including ones they would not actually employ) and the social significance of their use. Wilson & Henry (1998:17–18) point out that there may be critical periods for this similar to those for language learning. This competence in multiple varieties is arguably the primary vehicle of linguistic change.

John Wells argues that going past the common core creates difficulties that add greater complexity and falsely assume a shared underlying form in all accents:

Only by making the diaphonemic representation a rather remote, underlying form, linked to actual surface representations in given accents by a long chain of rules–only in this way could we resolve the obvious difficulties of the taxonomic diaphoneme.

Wells gives the example of straight, late and wait, which rhyme in most English varieties but, because some dialects make phonemic contrasts with the vowels of these words (specifically, in parts of the north of England (Note: These dialects pronounce the vowels as [ɛɪ(x)], [eː], and [ɛɪ], respectively; the assumption being that words like straight have an underlying but unpronounced velar fricative)), a panlectal transcription would have to encode this contrast despite it being absent for most speakers, making such a system "a linguist's construct" and not part of the grammar present in any native speaker's mind (which is what adherents of such a system attempt to achieve). Hall (1965:337) argues that such constructs are appropriate but only when they are removed before the final formulation of grammatical analysis. Wells puts even more weight on the phonotactic difference between rhotic and non-rhotic accents—the former have an underlying /r/ in words like derby and star while the latter, arguably, do not—and to the unstressed vowel of happy, which aligns phonetically with the vowel of KIT in some varieties and that of FLEECE in others.

Hans Kurath, particularly prominent in comparative analysis of British and American regional features, makes the case that the systematic features of British and American English largely agree but for a handful of divergences, for example:

- postvocalic /r/
- ingliding and upgliding varieties of /e/
- New England short /ɵ/
- coalescence of /ɑ/ and /ɔ/
- variation of /ʊ/ and /u/ in a few lexical items
- the vowel of poor, door, and sure
- variations in /aɪ/ and /aʊ/

Despite downplaying the divergences, Kurath argued that there is no "total pattern" (a term from Trager & Smith (1951)) that can be imposed on all English dialects, nor of even American ones:

The linguist must analyze the system of each dialect separately before he can know what systematic features are shared by all dialects, or by groups of dialects. He must distinguish between the systematic features and sporadic unsystematized features of each dialect, since every dialect has elements that are not built into the system. To regard unsystematized features as part of a 'system' and to impose an 'over-all pattern' are spurious notions that must be rejected.

The description of a cognitively real polylectal grammar came with Trudgill (1974)'s set of rules for the speech of Norwich that, presumably, could generate any possible output for a specific population of speakers and was psychologically real for such speakers such that native residents who normally exhibited sound mergers (e.g. between the vowels of days and daze) could accurately and consistently make the distinction if called upon to imitate older Norwich speakers; these speakers were able to hear such a contrast but not produce it, meaning that they likely possessed the contrast as part of their linguistic repertoire.

Berdan (1977) argues that comprehension across varieties, when it is found, is insufficient evidence for the claim that polylectal grammars are part of speakers' linguistic competence. Ballard (1971) argues that an extrapolated panlectal (or even broadly polylectal) grammar from "idiosyncratic" grammars, such as those found in Trudgill (1974), would still not be part of speakers' linguistic competence; Moulton (1985:566) argues that attempting a polylectal grammar that encodes for a large number of dialects becomes too bizarre and that the traditional reconstructed proto-language is more appropriate for the stated benefits of polylectal grammars. Bailey (1973:27, 65), notable for advocating the construction of polylectal grammars, says that the generative rules of such grammars should be panlectal in the sense that they are potentially learned in the acquisition process, though no speaker should be expected to learn all of them.

Although question remains to their psychological reality, the usefulness of diaphonemes is shown in Newton (1972:19–23) with the loss of the front rounded vowel phoneme /y/ in Greek words like ξύλο and κοιλιά; this vowel merged with /i/ in most words and /u/ in the rest, though the distribution varies with dialect. A diasystem would thus have to present an additional underlying diaphoneme /y/ with generative rules that account for the dialectal distribution. Similarly, the diaphonemic system in Geraghty (1983) goes beyond the common core, marking contrasts that only appear in some varieties; Geraghty argues that, because of Fijian marriage customs that prompt exposure to other dialects, speakers may possess a diasystem that represents multiple dialects as part of their communicative competence.

== Representation ==
There are a number of ways diaphones are represented in literature. One way is through the IPA, this can be done with slashes, as if they are phonemes, or with other types of brackets:

- double slashes: ⫽bɪt⫽
- exclamation marks: !bɪt!
- vertical bars: |bɪt|
- curly brackets: {b.ɪ.t}
- backslashes: \bɪt\

The concept does not necessitate the formation of a transcription system. Diaphones can instead be represented with double slashes. This is the case, for example in Orten (1991) and Weinreich (1954) where diaphonemes are represented with bracketing:

$$\bigg/ \bigg/ \frac{RP, GA \qquad \mathrm{k}}{SSE, KA \qquad \mathrm{k}~vs. \mathrm{x}} \bigg/ \bigg/$$

In this scheme, Scottish Standard English and the accent of Kirkwall are shown to make a phonemic contrast between /k/ and /x/ while RP and GA are shown to possess only the former so that lock and loch are pronounced differently in the former group and identically in the latter.

Diaphonemic systems do not necessarily even have to utilize the IPA. Diaphones are useful in constructing a writing system that accommodates multiple dialects with different phonologies. Even in dialectology, diaphonemic transcriptions may instead be based on the language's orthography, as is the case with Lee Pederson's Automated Book Code designed for information from the Linguistic Atlas of the Gulf States and the diaphonemic transcription system used by Paul Geraghty for related Fijian languages uses a modified Roman script.

== See also ==
- Comparative method
- Diasystem
- Ernst Pulgram
- International Phonetic Alphabet chart for English dialects
- Lexical set
- Morphophonology
- Phonological history of English vowels
- Robert A. Hall, Jr.
