= Linguistic Atlas of the Gulf States =

The Linguistic Atlas of the Gulf States (LAGS) is a linguistic atlas documenting the dialects of eight Southern states: Florida, Georgia, Tennessee, Alabama, Mississippi, Louisiana, Arkansas, and Texas. Directed by linguist Lee Pederson at Emory University, the project collected data from 914 speakers between 1968 and 1983. The atlas was published in seven volumes by the University of Georgia Press between 1986 and 1992.

LAGS was notable for introducing quota sampling to American dialectology and for pioneering computerized analysis of linguistic atlas data through an "automatic atlas" system. The project's approximately 1.2 million responses represent one of the largest dialect surveys conducted in the United States.

== Development ==
LAGS was conceived as part of the broader Linguistic Atlas Project, a nationwide effort to document American English dialects that began in 1929. Lee Pederson (1930–2015), who had completed his PhD at the University of Chicago under dialectologist Raven I. McDavid Jr., joined Emory University in 1966 and was charged with creating a linguistic atlas for the Gulf States region.

The project began with the Dialect Survey of Rural Georgia in the late 1960s, which served as groundwork for the larger LAGS effort. Pederson and his team, including graduate students and colleagues, conducted fieldwork from 1968 to 1983, traveling to communities across the eight-state region with tape recorders and microphones to conduct interviews.

== Methodology ==
=== Informant selection ===
LAGS departed from traditional linguistic atlas methodology by employing quota sampling rather than the conventional approach of selecting two informants per county. Informants were carefully stratified by location, age, education, sex, and race to create a representative sample of Gulf States speech. This approach, uncommon in American dialectology at the time, allowed researchers to analyze social and demographic patterns in language variation more systematically.

=== Interviewing and recording ===
Each of the 914 primary consultants was interviewed using a 104-page questionnaire designed in the Linguistic Atlas Project format, with revisions made by Pederson to capture specific Southern speech characteristics. Unlike earlier atlas projects that recorded only select interviews, LAGS audio-recorded all interviews, producing 5,200 hours of tape recordings. Interview styles varied in formality, with the most successful interviews containing extensive conversation and narrative rather than simple question-and-response exchanges.

=== Data organization ===
The LAGS database was organized into 1,177 computer files recording responses from the 914 primary consultants:

- 390 lexical files
- 290 grammatical files
- 423 graphophonemic files
- 74 systematic phonetics files

An urban supplement added 201 additional lexical files, bringing the total number of responses to approximately 1.2 million.

== Published volumes ==
The atlas was published in seven volumes between 1986 and 1992, all edited by Lee Pederson, Susan Leas McDaniel, and Carol M. Adams:

1. Handbook for the Linguistic Atlas of the Gulf States (1986)
2. General Index to the Linguistic Atlas of the Gulf States (1988)
3. Technical Index to the Linguistic Atlas of the Gulf States (1989)
4. Regional Matrix for the Linguistic Atlas of the Gulf States (1990) – includes eight transparent map overlays
5. Regional Pattern for the Linguistic Atlas of the Gulf States (1991) – includes three transparent map overlays
6. Social Matrix for the Linguistic Atlas of the Gulf States (1990)
7. Social Pattern for the Linguistic Atlas of the Gulf States (1992)

In addition to the published volumes, University Microfilms International (now ProQuest) published supplementary materials in microform, including the Manual for Dialect Research in the Southern States (245 pages), identification tables, idiolect synopses (1,118 pages), protocols (126,000 pages of phonetic transcriptions), and a concordance converting phonetic strings to orthographic strings.

== Technological innovations ==
LAGS pioneered the use of computerized analysis in American dialectology. The project developed an "automatic atlas" system in which all data was encoded as ASCII files for microcomputer analysis. The system included sorting and mapping programs that allowed for nearly instantaneous analysis of regional dialect patterns, a significant advancement over manual cartographic methods used in earlier linguistic atlases.

Pederson published several articles describing these innovations, including "A Graphic Plotter Grid" (1986), "Electronic Matrix Maps" (1988), and "Elements of Word Geography" (1995).

== Legacy and scholarly impact ==
LAGS contributed approximately 2,400 citations to the Dictionary of American Regional English (DARE). The project has been used to study various linguistic phenomena in Southern American English, including double modals (such as "might could"), gender-based language differences, and regional dialect boundaries within individual states.

A scholarly volume, From the Gulf States and Beyond: The Legacy of Lee Pederson and LAGS (1998), edited by Michael B. Montgomery and Thomas E. Nunnally, provided a comprehensive assessment of the project and demonstrated applications of LAGS data to sociolinguistics, dialectology, and folklore studies.

The original LAGS records are maintained in the Special Collections Department of the Emory University Library, with copies of most tapes at the University of Georgia Library. Audio recordings have been digitized and are available through the Linguistic Atlas Projects website. The project is currently directed by William A. Kretzschmar, Jr.

== See also ==
- Linguistic Atlas Project
- Southern American English
- American English
- Dialectology
