= Linguistic Atlas of New England =

- Author: Hans Kurath
- Language: English
- Published: AMS Press Inc. 1939
- Publication place: United States
- ISBN: 0404100473

The Linguistic Atlas of New England (LANE), edited by Hans Kurath in collaboration with Miles L. Hanley, Bernard Bloch, Guy S. Lowman, Marcus L. Hansen and Julia Bloch, is a book of linguistic maps describing the dialects of New England in the 1930s. LANE consists of 734 maps over three volumes, and is the first major study of the dialects in the northeastern United States. The six New England states were studied—Maine, Vermont, New Hampshire, Massachusetts, Connecticut, and Rhode Island—in addition to some data from Long Island in the state of New York, and the southern edge of the Canadian province of New Brunswick. Transcriptions of pronunciations elicited from informants across the region were printed directly onto maps of New England, at the location of each informant's hometown. One map was included for each of the 734 items that were studied.

== Background ==
LANE was the first component of the Linguistic Atlas of the United States (LAUS). LAUS was first proposed in 1928 by a committee of the Modern Language Association, and collaborative meetings with the Linguistic Society of America (LSA) began in 1929 to discuss the feasibility of the proposed linguistic atlas of the United States and Canada. In 1930, the LSA Council requested a trial run in a limited area, so that a method could be established and budget estimates could be taken for further work in other regions. In 1931, the LSA Council granted approval for the study of New England speech.

Over the following years, preparations for LANE were made. The staff of the project was appointed, including Hans Kurath as director and Miles L. Haney as associate director. Additional staff members were hired with the help of fellowships from Brown University and the University of Vermont. Yale University provided headquarters for the project. Staff were trained over six weeks in the summer of 1931 before beginning fieldwork. Linguists who had experience mapping the dialects of Switzerland and Italy, Jakob Jud and Paul Schauermeier, assisted in the training process.

The first component of the research took into account the historical background of New England's settlement and population. This provided a basis for which communities would be selected for study in LANE. After this initial historical investigation by Marcus L. Hansen (University of Illinois), data collection commenced. This phase spanned 25 months, and finished in September 1933.

== Methodology ==
=== Informants ===
416 informants were interviewed across 213 New England communities. Though there were 431 towns and cities investigated altogether, neighboring towns were sometimes grouped together. Historical backgrounds for each town and details about each informant are given in the accompanying Handbook. Two informants of different social strata were selected from each county whenever possible. Kurath specified that one of the informants must be elderly, old-fashioned, and uneducated and the other must be middle-class and have some education. Field workers characterized informants, based on education levels and age, into Type I (little formal education), Type II (moderate formal education), or Type III (high education level), and Type A (old-fashioned) or Type B (younger, more modern).

=== Notation ===
Field workers used modified IPA phonetic transcription. Some additional notations were used to indicate more information, such as c. indicating the target form was spoken in natural conversation, r. indicating repetition at the field worker's request, s. indicating that the informant agreed the form was natural after hearing it suggested by the field worker, and f. indicating that the response was forced due to the field worker's insistence.

=== Supplementary Materials ===
Though most of the data were only transcribed, aluminum field recordings were made between 1933-1939 and some of the surviving records are digitized at the Library of Congress.

The Handbook of the Linguistic Geography of New England (1939), by Hans Kurath and Miles L. Hanley was published in conjunction with LANE. This handbook discusses the dialect areas of New England, Kurath's methodology, the history of New England's settlement, the phonetic notation and worksheets used in data collection, and the communities and informants that were involved.

=== Questionnaire ===
The questionnaire consisted of 734 items that each informant answered. These 734 items were split across LANE's three volumes, in the following distribution:

Volume 1	Items
Introductory	1-3
Geography	4-27
Topography	28-51
Numerals	52-63
Time	64-86
Weather	87-100
The Farm	101-119
Agriculture	120-128
Containers and Utensils	129-161
Vehicles	163-188
Domestic Animals	189-217
Calls to Animals	218-227
Other Animals	228-242

Volume 1 had lexical categories focusing on basic words and agricultural society.

Volume 2	Items
Trees and Shrubs	243-252
Vegetables, Fruits, Berries	253-280
Food and Clothing	281-313
Mealtime	314-322
Dwellings	323-356
Clothing	357-369
Family	370-398
Social Relations	399-423
Greetings, Prepositions, and Salutations	424-431
Names, Titles, Occupations	432-455
Personal Characteristics	456-484
Body Parts	485-491

Volume 2 included topics of food, familial relationships, and descriptions of people.

Volume 3	Items
Illness and Death	492-526
Religion	527-534
Public Institutions	535-551
Business	552-572
Sport and Play	573-587
Affirmations and Interjections	588-602
Pronouns	603-634
Verb Forms: Preterites and Participles	635-672
Verb Forms: Be, Have, Do	673-690
Verb Forms: Concord	691-693
Verb Forms: Modals	694-704
Adverbs	705-719
Prepositions	720-726
Conjunctions	727-734

Volume 3 included topics of societal institutions as well as several verb forms and other parts of speech.

== Findings ==
A main dialect boundary was found between Eastern New England and Western New England. Unique variations in vocabulary and pronunciation also were found in the Boston area, the Plymouth area, the Narragansett Bay area, New Hampshire Bay and the Merrimack Valley, Maine, the New London area, Worcester County and the upper Connecticut valley, the Lower Connecticut valley, the Long Island Sound, and the Hudson Valley.

A noted error in the Atlas's results is in its descriptions of the low back vowels in Rhode Island, where the Atlas incorrectly reported the cot-caught merger to be present. Raven McDavid later concluded that the cause of the error was that the fieldworker who transcribed the Rhode Island data was herself a speaker of a dialect with the merger, and inadvertently applied the merger in her transcriptions.
