= Diaphonic =

Diaphonic may denote a relation to:

- Diaphoneme and diaphones, in linguistics
- Diaphonia or parallel harmony, in music
- Diaphone, a type of organ pipe or horn
