= Bernard Bloch (linguist) =

American linguist (1907–1965)

Bernard Bloch (18 June 1907, New York City, New York – 26 November 1965, New Haven, Connecticut) was an American linguist. He taught at Brown University and was Professor of Linguistics at Yale University.

== Career ==
Bloch first studied linguistics at Northwestern University. In the early 1930s, he was recommended by his teacher, Werner F. Leopold, as a fieldworker for the Linguistic Atlas project led by Hans Kurath. While undertaking fieldwork on New England dialects, he also taught part-time at Mount Holyoke College. There he met his future wife, Julia McDonnell Bloch.

Bloch enrolled for doctoral studies at Brown University, where he studied under Hans Kurath. In 1935 he received his PhD for a thesis entitled, "The treatment of Middle English final and preconsonantal R in the present-day speech of New England".

From 1937–1943 he served as instructor and then assistant professor at Brown. During this period Bernard and Julia Bloch were on the editorial staff of the Linguistic Atlas of New England (1939–1943). They also contributed to the Handbook of the Linguistic Geography of New England.

In 1943 Bloch took up a position at Yale, where he eventually became professor of linguistics.

Bloch is considered one of the leading linguists of the post-Bloomfieldian school, active in the 1940s and 1950s, who concentrated on the description of synchronic language systems and on the development of a methodology for collecting and analyzing language data. Bloch's work contributed to three main areas of linguistic research: phonology, syntax and the analysis of Japanese. His analysis of spoken Japanese had a lasting influence on Japanese language textbooks in the US.

== Contributions to the Linguistic Society of America ==
Bloch was president of the Linguistic Society of America in 1953. He was Editor of the society's publication, Language, from 1940 until his death.

The Bernard and Julia Bloch Fellowship, awarded by the Linguistic Society of America to 'the most promising applicant' to the LSA Summer Institute, was established from the Julia Bloch Memorial Fund. The Bernard and Julia Bloch fellowship was first awarded in the summer of 1970.

== Notable students ==
- Floyd Lounsbury
- Wallace Chafe
- John Robert Ross (research assistant)
- Samuel Martin

== Personal life ==
His father, Albert Bloch, was the only American member of Der Blaue Reiter (The Blue Rider), a group of early 20th-century European modernist painters. His brother was the film writer Walter Bloch, who also wrote under the name, Walter Black.

== Selected publications ==
- Linguistic Atlas of the United States and Canada: Section I. Linguistic Atlas of New England, Vol.1, Maps (with Hans Kurath, Miles L. Hanley, Marcus L. Hansen, Guy S. Lowman, Jr.), Brown University, Providence, 1939
- "Postvocalic r in New England speech, a study in American dialect geography." In Readings in American Dialectology, eds. Harold Byron Allen and Gary N. Underwood. New York: Appleton-Century-Crofts., 1939
- Handbook of the Linguistic Geography of New England (with Hans Kurath, Marcus L. Hansen, Julia Bloch), Brown University, Providence, 1939
- Linguistic Atlas of New England, Vol.2, Maps (with Hans Kurath, etc.), Brown University, Providence, 1943

Phonology

- "The Syllabic Phonemes of English" ~ "Language 17" (with G. L. Trager), 1941
- "Phonemic Overlapping" ~ "American Speech 16", 1941
- "A Set of Postulates for Phonemic Analysis" ~ "Language 24", 1948

Syntax

- Outline of Linguistic Analysis (with G. L. Trager), Waverly Press, Baltimore, 1942
  - Japanese translation: "言語分析の概要", 南雲堂, 1980

Analysis of Japanese

- Spoken Japanese, 2 vols., Henry Holt & Co., New York, 1945, 1946 (with E. H. Jordan)
- "Studies in Colloquial Japanese"
  - "Studies in Colloquial Japanese: I.Inflection" ~ "Journal of the American Oriental Society 66", 1946
  - "II.Syntax" ~ "Language 22", 1946
  - "III.Derivation of Inflected Words" ~ "Journal of the American Oriental Society 66"
  - "IV.Phonemics" ~ "Language 26", 1950
- Bernard Bloch on Japanese, Yale University Press, New Haven/London, 1970 (ed. R. A. Miller)
  Japanese translation: "ブロック日本語論考", 林栄一 監・訳, 研究社, 1975
  - "Studies in Colloquial Japanese: I. Inflection" ~ "Journal of the American Oriental Society 66", 1946
  - "II. Syntax" ~ "Language 22", 1946
  - "III. Derivation of Inflected Words" ~ "Journal of the American Oriental Society 66"
  - "IV. Phonemics" ~ "Language 26", 1950
