= Julia Bloch =

American linguist

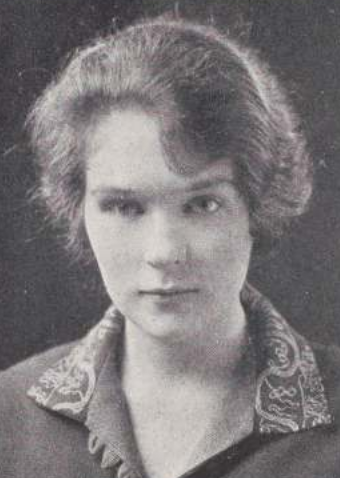
- Julia McDonnell, from the 1925 yearbook of Mount Holyoke College
- Born: May 3, 1904; Holyoke, Massachusetts
- Died: October 22, 1960 (aged 56); New Haven, Connecticut
- Occupation: Linguist
- Spouse: Bernard Bloch

Julia McDonnell Bloch (May 3, 1904 – October 22, 1960) was an American linguist. She was on the editorial staff of the Linguistic Atlas of New England (1939-1943), assisting in the preparation of its 700 dialect maps. She also contributed to the Handbook of the Linguistic Geography of New England.

== Early life and education ==
Julia Evelyn McDonnell was born in Holyoke, Massachusetts, and attended schools in South Hadley, Massachusetts. She graduated from Mount Holyoke College in 1925. She earned a master's degree in English literature from Wellesley College in 1926. In the 1930s she pursued further studies at the University of Michigan.

== Career ==
Bloch and her husband were on the editorial staff of the Linguistic Atlas of New England (1939-1943), assisting in the preparation of its 700 dialect maps. She also contributed to the Handbook of the Linguistic Geography of New England. These books were part of a Linguistic Atlas project directed by Hans Kurath.

== Personal life and legacy ==
Julia Bloch was married to the American linguist, Bernard Bloch, from 1932 until her death. They met when they were both working in the English department at Mount Holyoke College. They had a son, Walter, born in 1942.

Julia Bloch died in 1960, in New Haven, Connecticut, aged 56 years. The Bernard and Julia Bloch Fellowship, awarded by the Linguistic Society of America (LSA) to "the most promising applicant" to the LSA Summer Institute, was established from the Julia Bloch Memorial Fund. The Bernard and Julia Bloch Fellowship was first awarded in the summer of 1970.

== Publications ==
- Handbook of the linguistic geography of New England, by Hans Kurath with the collaboration of Marcus L. Hansen, Julia Bloch [and] Bernard Bloch. Providence: Brown University, 1939.
- Linguistic Atlas of New England, by Hans Kurath, Miles L. Hanley, Bernard Bloch, Marcus L. Hansen and Julia Bloch. 3 vols. Providence: Brown University, 1939–1943.
