= The American Language =

1919 book by H.L. Mencken

The American Language; An Inquiry into the Development of English in the United States
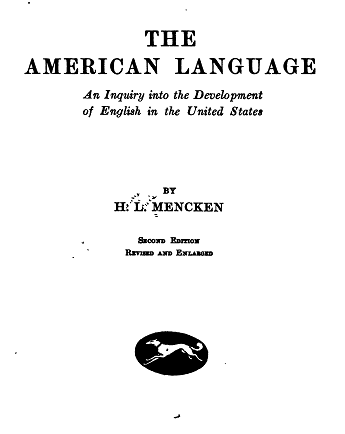
- 1921 title page
- Author: H. L. Mencken
- Language: English
- Genre: Linguistics
- Publisher: Alfred A. Knopf
- Publication date: 1919
- Publication place: United States

The American Language; An Inquiry into the Development of English in the United States, first published in 1919, is a book written by H. L. Mencken about the English language as spoken in the United States.

== Origins and concept ==
Mencken was inspired by "the argot of the colored waiters" in Washington, as well as one of his favorite authors, Mark Twain, and his experiences on the streets of Baltimore. In 1902, Mencken remarked on the "queer words which go into the making of 'United States.'" The book was preceded by several columns in The Evening Sun. Mencken eventually asked "Why doesn't some painstaking pundit attempt a grammar of the American language... English, that is, as spoken by the great masses of the plain people of this fair land?"

In the tradition of Noah Webster, who wrote the first American dictionary, Mencken wanted to defend "Americanisms" against a steady stream of English critics, who usually isolated Americanisms as borderline "perversions" of the "mother tongue". Mencken assaulted the prescriptive grammar of these critics and American "schoolmarms", arguing, like Samuel Johnson in the preface to his dictionary, that language evolves independently of textbooks.

The book discusses the beginnings of "American" variations from "English", the spread of these variations, American names and slang over the course of its 374 pages. According to Mencken, American English was more colourful, vivid, and creative than its British counterpart.

The book sold exceptionally well for a reference book — 1500 books, the entire first printing, in less than 2 years. The book was an early title published by Alfred A. Knopf and was revised three times in the author's lifetime. Reviews of the book praised it lavishly, with the exception of one by Mencken's old nemesis, Stuart Sherman.

Many of the sources and research material associated with the book are in the Mencken collection at the Enoch Pratt Free Library in Baltimore, Maryland.

== Editions ==
The first edition of 1919 was revised in 1921 and 1923; the fourth "corrected, revised, and enlarged" edition was published in 1936. Mencken released two full-sized Supplements to the main volume, in 1945 and 1948, based on the boom in linguistics articles. An abridged single-volume compilation of the original volume and supplements was edited by Raven I. McDavid Jr. and published in 1963.

- Mencken, Henry Louis (1919). The American Language; A Preliminary Inquiry into the Development of English in the United States (1st ed.). New York City: Alfred A. Knopf.
- Mencken, Henry Louis (2000) [1921]. The American Language; An Inquiry into the Development of English in the United States (2nd ed.). Bartleby.com. ISBN 1-58734-087-9.
- Mencken, Henry Louis (1923). The American Language; An Inquiry into the Development of English in the United States (3rd ed.). New York City: Alfred A. Knopf. OCLC 551316331.
- Mencken, Henry Louis (1949) [1936]. The American Language; An Inquiry into the Development of English in the United States (4th ed.). New York City: Alfred A. Knopf.
- Mencken, Henry Louis (1960) [1945]. The American Language; An Inquiry into the Development of English in the United States; Supplement I. New York City: Alfred A. Knopf.
- Mencken, Henry Louis (1962) [1948]. The American Language; An Inquiry into the Development of English in the United States; Supplement II. New York City: Alfred A. Knopf.
- Mencken, Henry Louis (1963). McDavid, Raven I. (ed.). The American Language; An Inquiry into the Development of English in the United States (abridged ed.). New York City: Alfred A. Knopf. OCLC 301277059.

== Audiobooks ==
An audiobook version was released in 2021 by Spoken Realms, read by Rebecca H. Lee.

== Sources ==
- Hobson, Fred. Mencken. Random House, New York, 1994.
