= Linguistic Atlas of the Upper Midwest =

- Title page for Linguistic Atlas of the Upper Midwest (1973)
- Author: Harold Allen
- Language: English
- Published: University of Minnesota Press 1973–1976
- Publication place: United States
- ISBN: 9780816606863

The Linguistic Atlas of the Upper Midwest (LAUM) is a linguistic atlas documenting regional dialect variation in the American Upper Midwest, directed by Harold B. Allen. LAUM consists of 800 maps published in three volumes between 1973 and 1976, with each map corresponding to a surveyed linguistic item. The project studied five Midwestern states: Iowa, Nebraska, Minnesota, North Dakota, and South Dakota. It also included a small number of participants from the Canadian provinces of Manitoba, Ontario, and Saskatchewan. The atlas has been used to examine 19th-century westward migration patterns and their relationship to regional speech variation.

== Background ==
LAUM is part of the broader Linguistic Atlas Project, a nationwide effort to document American English dialects. The American Dialect Society formed the Linguistic Atlas Project in 1929 with a vision of creating a comprehensive linguistic atlas of the United States and Canada. The project developed into a series of independent regional studies as fieldwork expanded across different areas and was organized at multiple institutions.

Harold B. Allen was named director of what initially began as a Minnesota atlas project. Fieldwork for LAUM originated as a study of Minnesota folk speech intended to contribute to the Linguistic Atlas of the North Central States (LANCS). The project expanded to cover additional Midwestern states, beginning fieldwork in 1947 to document linguistic variation associated with 19th-century settlement and westward migration from New England and the Atlantic states.

Linguists from Iowa, North Dakota, and South Dakota contributed to the project through funding and research. Data collection from South Dakota and Nebraska was completed by 1955, and the three-volume atlas was published between 1973 and 1976.

== Methodology ==
=== Informants ===
A total of 208 informants were interviewed across 97 Midwestern communities. Fieldworkers categorized informants by education and age into three types: Type I (older speakers with little formal education), Type II (middle-aged speakers with moderate formal education), and Type III (younger speakers with higher levels of formal education). These categories were intended to capture social variation in speech and to facilitate comparison across communities.

The informant distribution across U.S. states was: 65 informants from 26 Minnesota communities, 52 informants from 23 Iowa communities, 26 informants from 14 North Dakota communities, 28 informants from 16 South Dakota communities, and 37 informants from 18 Nebraska communities.

Five informants were interviewed from Manitoba, Ontario, and Saskatchewan, Canada.

=== Transcription and notation ===
Fieldworkers used IPA-based transcription. Additional notation, consistent with other linguistic atlas projects, distinguished forms recorded in conversation (c.), repetitions (r.), suggested forms accepted by the informant (s.), and responses elicited through persistent questioning (f.).

=== Questionnaire ===
The questionnaire consisted of approximately 800 items answered by each informant. The items covered lexical, grammatical, and phonological variation. The categories are distributed across the three volumes, with elements of each category appearing in multiple volumes.

Questionnaire categories
Category	Items
Numerals	1.1 – 2.5
Time	3.1 – 5.2
Weather	5.3 – 6.5
Dwelling	6.6 – 10.3
Farm	10.4 – 34.6
Pronouns	34.7 – 35.4
Food	35.5 – 45.6
Animals & Plants	45.7 – 48.8
Family	49.1 – 53.7
Physiology	54.6 – 56.3
Characteristics	56.4 – 57.7
Illness	58.1 – 61.1
Social life	61.5 – 64.4
Geography	64.5 – 65.4
Religion	66.1 – 67.2
Activities	68.4 – 76.4

Volume I includes lexical material and community information. Volume II contains data on grammatical forms such as verbs, pronouns, prepositions, and adverbs. Volume III focuses on linguistic maps and phonological variation.

== Findings ==
=== Migration patterns ===
The atlas identified two primary westward migration patterns associated with regional speech variation in the 19th century. One pattern originated in northern New England, while the other began near the Pennsylvania–New Jersey border. Both migration streams passed through Ohio and Illinois before reaching the Midwestern states. A third pattern was associated with immigration from Canada to the northern border regions, though the limited number of Canadian informants (five) precluded definitive conclusions about Canadian influence on Upper Midwest speech.

=== Linguistic variation ===
Significant phonetic differences were documented along the border between the Northern states (Minnesota, North Dakota, and South Dakota) and the Midland states (Iowa and Nebraska). Regional variations included aspiration of the /w/ phoneme and vowel shifts.

Allen reported that the atlas recorded relatively limited lexical divergence in comparison with earlier regional atlas projects, with many changes involving shifts within existing lexical inventories rather than entirely new forms.

Seventeen of the 800 recorded items were found only in Canada or along the Canadian-Minnesota border. Thirteen phonetic features were associated with Canadian English speakers, and nine of those features appeared exclusively in Canadian speech.

Allen noted evidence of contact with other languages in the speech of approximately 20% of informants, most commonly among speakers with Scandinavian, German, or French backgrounds. The primary reported difference among speakers with foreign language influence was intonation; for example, German-influenced and French-influenced varieties differed in prosody.

== Institutional history ==
The Linguistic Atlas Project was established in 1929 and has been housed at several institutions over its history, including Brown University, the University of Chicago, the University of Michigan, and the University of Georgia. Since 2018, it has been based at the University of Kentucky under the direction of Allison Burkette, where LAUM and other regional atlas materials are maintained.

== See also ==
- Linguistic Atlas Project
- Dialectology
- American English
- Upper Midwest
