= Linguistic Atlas Project =

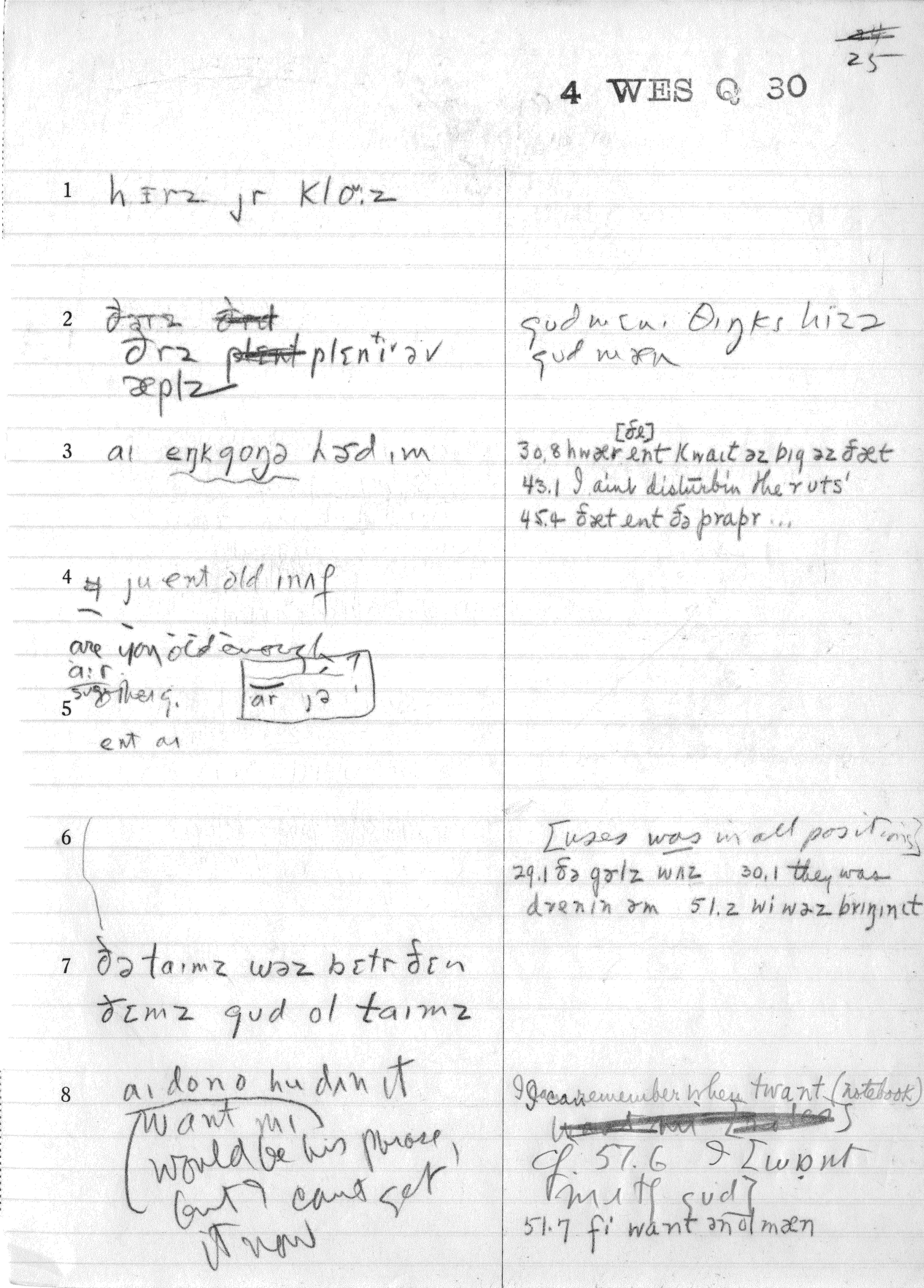
A page of Linguistic Atlas Project field notes with phonetic transcription on the left and fieldworker notes on the right.

The Linguistic Atlas Project (LAP) is a linguistic research initiative that documents dialectal variation in American English. The LAP conducts regional dialect surveys using structured interviews to produce linguistic atlases. It was founded by the American Dialect Society in 1929 and initially directed by Hans Kurath. The LAP consists of multiple regional sub-projects that examine variation in vocabulary, pronunciation, and grammar to identify historical settlement patterns and cultural influences.

More than 5,000 face-to-face dialect interviews have been conducted across the United States. The project includes more than 8,500 hours of audio recordings, which are accessible through online interfaces and public repositories.

Over its history, the LAP has been housed at multiple institutions. It was based at the University of Georgia for more than 25 years, and since 2018 has been housed at the University of Kentucky under the direction of Allison Burkette, where it is undergoing digitization to make materials publicly available for research.

== History ==
The LAP was conceived as part of a broader plan for a Linguistic Atlas of the United States and Canada to document North American English dialects. Kurath's work on regional English contributed to proposals for a systematic study, and in 1926 he worked with the Modern Language Association to begin planning for the project. The American Dialect Society founded the LAP in 1929 under Kurath's direction.

The first regional atlas project, the Linguistic Atlas of New England (LANE), was conducted from 1931 to 1933 and served as a pilot study. Before fieldwork began, Marcus L. Hansen of the University of Illinois conducted a historical investigation of New England's settlement and population patterns to provide a basis for community selection. Staff were trained over six weeks in the summer of 1931 before beginning fieldwork, and linguists with experience mapping the dialects of Switzerland and Italy, Jakob Jud and Paul Schauermeier, assisted in training. As additional regions were planned and surveyed, the project expanded into multiple regional operations, and Kurath's students and other researchers established additional surveys at universities throughout the United States.

The LANE project developed early audio recording techniques for linguistic fieldwork. Miles L. Hanley, associate director for LANE, developed a system for recording sound on aluminum discs using automobile batteries as a power source. Although these recordings (1933–1939) were intended as supporting data for LANE, they were not used in that capacity; later, the recordings provided material used in work connected to the Dictionary of American Regional English. The recordings have been digitized and made available through the Library of Congress.

== Methodology ==
=== Fieldwork design ===
Kurath established criteria for selecting both informants and communities. Communities were screened to prioritize towns that were early American settlements or could be linked to them through historical records.

For informant selection, Kurath specified that at least two people should be chosen from each county: one described as "old-fashioned and unschooled" (often a farmer or farmer's wife) and another as a middle-class speaker with at least grade-school or high-school education. Fieldworkers further categorized informants by education level (Type I–III) and by age (Type A for older "old-fashioned" speakers and Type B for younger speakers).

Each regional atlas project conducted face-to-face dialect interviews using structured questionnaires, which were adapted to capture regional linguistic characteristics. Questionnaire length varied by region and time period, ranging from 734 items (LANE) to over 800 items in later projects. Examples include the Linguistic Atlas of the Gulf States' 104-page questionnaire, and the Linguistic Atlas of the North Central States' 75-page questionnaire.

Questions covered topics ranging from household items and farm equipment to weather, flora and fauna, food preparation, and community relationships.

=== Transcription ===
Fieldworkers transcribed responses using phonetic notation, including IPA-based transcription to capture pronunciation detail. In the earliest projects, transcriptions were made in handwritten field notes. Later projects incorporated audio recordings on media such as aluminum discs, reel-to-reel tapes, and cassette tapes. Fieldworkers also used notation to provide additional context about responses, including "c." for forms produced in natural conversation, "r." for repetitions at the fieldworker's request, "s." for forms accepted after suggestion, and "f." for forms recorded after insistence by the fieldworker.

== Regional atlas projects ==
The LAP is composed of multiple regional atlas projects. While all surveys used a broadly similar interview format and covered many of the same questionnaire topics, individual projects adapted prompts and elicitation strategies to local conditions.

Regional atlas projects
Name	Founding director(s)	Interview dates	Areas covered	Number of speakers	Audio recordings
LANE	Hans Kurath	1931–1933	ME, NH, VT, MA, RI, CT, NY (Note: Only Long Island in LANE.), NB (Note: Southern New Brunswick was included in the survey.)	416	Partial
LAMSAS	Hans Kurath	1933–1974	NY, NJ, PA, WV, DE, MD, VA, NC, SC, GA, FL	1,162	Partial
LANCS	Albert H. Marckwardt	1933–1978	WI, MI, IL, IN, OH, KY	564	Partial; transcription ongoing
LAGS	Lee Pederson	1968–1983	FL, GA, TN, AL, MS, LA, AR, TX	914	Yes
LAO	William Van Riper	1959–1963	OK	57	Yes
LAPNW	Carroll Reed; David Carlson	—	OR, WA, ID, MT	51	Partial
LAPC	David Reed; Allen Metcalf	1952–1959	CA, NV	300	No
LAMR	M. Madsen; L. Antieau	1988–2003	CO, WY, UT	70	Yes; fully transcribed
LAUM	Harold B. Allen; Michael Linn	1949–1962	MN, IA, ND, SD, NE	208	No
GDS	Lee Pederson	1968–1972	GA	288	Yes
LDS	C. M. Wise	1935–1951	LA	84	No
LAH	C. M. Wise	1950	HI	8	No
Gullah	Lorenzo Dow Turner	1933	SC, GA	21	No
SKNP	Lee Pederson	2003	St. Kitts and Nevis	23	Yes
LASE	G. Lowman	1937–1938	Southern England	73	No
HUVA	J. Hawkins	1938–1940	NY, NJ	34	No

=== Examples of regional variation ===
LAP materials document regional variation in American English vocabulary. Representative examples include:

- Furniture for clothes: bureau, dresser, chest of drawers
- Paper bag: poke (Southern), sack (widespread)
- Dragonfly: snake feeder, mosquito hawk, devil's darning needle, devil's racehorse (particularly in Kentucky)
- Burial grounds: graveyard, cemetery, burial ground, boneyard, skull orchard
- Garden vegetables: garden sass, garden truck
- Breads made from cornmeal: cornbread, johnnycake, cornpone, hoecake, spoonbread
- Cheese made from slightly soured milk: cottage cheese, bonny clabber, bonny clapper, labbered milk

== Ongoing work ==
The LAP maintains an archive of interview materials in formats reflecting different technological eras, including handwritten field notes, aluminum disc recordings, reel-to-reel tapes, cassette tapes, and CDs. Data can be exported in CSV format and is available through online databases and public repositories, including an open-access GitHub repository.

Digitized images of fieldworker note pages are available through the Linguistic Atlas Project website for the following regional atlas projects:

- Gullah
- Linguistic Atlas of Hawaii (LAH)
- Linguistic Atlas of New England (LANE)
- Linguistic Atlas of the Middle and South Atlantic States (LAMSAS)
- Linguistic Atlas of the North Central States (LANCS)

At the University of Kentucky, the LAP is conducting follow-up interviews across Kentucky and comparing them with interviews from the late 1950s and 1960s to study language change over time. Students are trained in interviewing and data processing, including transcription of handwritten phonetic field notes and work with both physical and digital LAP materials.

== Research ==
LAP materials have been used in major studies of American dialectology. Hans Kurath's A Word Geography of the Eastern United States (1949) used early atlas data to map isoglosses and propose a three-way regional division of the eastern United States (North, Midland, South), identifying smaller speech areas based on similarities in vocabulary, grammar, and pronunciation. Kurath and Raven I. McDavid Jr.'s The Pronunciation of English in the Atlantic States (1961) analyzed phonological variation in the eastern United States using atlas materials. E. Bagby Atwood's A Survey of Verb Forms in the Eastern United States (1953) examined grammatical variation using atlas data.

Individual regional atlas projects have produced handbooks and methodological documentation. The Handbook of the Linguistic Atlas of the Middle and South Atlantic States (1993) describes LAMSAS methodology, informant selection, and community histories, and discusses how LAMSAS data have been used to relate dialect differences to migration routes and settlement patterns, including contrasts between inland and coastal settlement histories and between regions associated with plantation and small-farm agriculture.

Contemporary researchers continue to use LAP data to study dialect variation, language change, and sociolinguistic patterns in American English. Recent studies have examined topics including vowel dynamics in Southern American English, regional grammatical features such as a-prefixing, spatial patterns of linguistic variation, sociophonetic analysis of historical speech corpora, and language ideologies reflected in informant biographies.

A special issue of American Speech published in 2022 examined twenty-first-century perspectives on the Linguistic Atlas Projects, reflecting renewed scholarly interest in the historical data and its applications to contemporary linguistic questions.
