= The Conspirators (Prokosch novel) =

Novel by Frederic Prokosch

- Author: Frederic Prokosch
- Language: English
- Genre: Thriller
- Publisher: Harper and Brothers
- Publication date: 1943
- Media type: Print

The Conspirators is a 1943 spy thriller novel by the American writer Frederic Prokosch. Written at the height of the Second World War, it takes place in Lisbon. In 1944 it was adapted into the film of the same title directed by Jean Negulesco and starring Hedy Lamarr and Paul Henreid.

== Synopsis ==
Vincent a member of the Dutch Resistance has escaped from a prison in Libson and now seeks out the undercover Nazi agent who betrayed him.

== Bibliography ==
- Goble, Alan. The Complete Index to Literary Sources in Film. Walter de Gruyter, 1999.
- Weber, Ronald. The Lisbon Route: Entry and Escape in Nazi Europe. Ivan R. Dee, 2011.
