= The Conspirators (1944 film) =

1944 film by Jean Negulesco

- Theatrical release poster
- Directed by: Jean Negulesco
- Screenplay by: Vladimir Pozner; Leo Rosten
- Based on: The Conspirators by Frederic Prokosch
- Produced by: Jack Chertok
- Starring: Hedy Lamarr; Paul Henreid; Sydney Greenstreet; Peter Lorre
- Cinematography: Arthur Edeson
- Edited by: Rudi Fehr
- Music by: Max Steiner
- Production company: Warner Bros.
- Distributed by: Warner Bros.
- Release date: October 24, 1944
- Running time: 101 minutes
- Country: United States
- Language: English

The Conspirators (or Give Me This Woman) is a 1944 American World War II spy film noir directed by Jean Negulesco. It stars Hedy Lamarr and Paul Henreid, features Sydney Greenstreet and Peter Lorre in supporting roles, and has a cameo of Aurora Miranda singing a Fado. The Conspirators reunites several cast who appeared in Casablanca (1942).

== Plot ==
During World War II, Vincent Van Der Lyn, a former schoolteacher who became a Dutch resistance fighter, causes so much trouble for the Nazis that they place a bounty on his head. As a result, he is ordered by his superiors to travel to England via neutral Portugal.

On Van Der Lyn's arrival in Lisbon, Police Captain Pereira notes that his passport has no exit stamp on it, indicating that he sneaked across the border, however reassures Van Der Lyn that as long as his Portuguese visa is in order there is no issue. German agent Otto Lutzke becomes suspicious, informs his superiors and starts tailing Van Der Lyn.

At a restaurant, Van Der Lyn is pleasantly surprised when a beautiful French woman, Irene Von Mohr, sits down at his table. Moments before, Irene had passed a card to a man in a nearby alley, only to witness him being shot in the back by an unknown assailant soon after. She flees into the restaurant, but as the police arrive to search the place, she quickly sits down at Van Der Lyn's table to throw off suspicion. She identifies herself to Van Der Lyn as merely a frequent gambler at the Casino Estoril. She excuses herself, supposedly to make a telephone call, but never returns. Van Der Lyn goes to the aforementioned casino where he finds Irene. As she warns him to stay away from her, they are joined by senior German diplomat Hugo Von Mohr and Lutzke. The Germans soon identify Van Der Lyn as the saboteur known as the "Flying Dutchman."

Van Der Lyn meets the local resistance leader, Ricardo Quintanilla, who introduces him to other members of his resistance group: Pole Jan Bernazsky, Norwegian Anton Wynat, and Frenchman Paulo Leiris. Quintanilla asks Van Der Lyn to brief Jennings, Van Der Lyn's replacement. In private, Quintanilla warns Van Der Lyn that he suspects one of their group is a traitor.

The next day, when Irene gets into her automobile, Van Der Lyn invites himself along for the ride. At first annoyed, she gradually warms to him, and they spend the day together. He professes that he is in love with her. She reveals that she is married to Hugo, who rescued her from Dachau concentration camp.

When Van Der Lyn returns to his hotel room, he finds Jennings slumped over his desk. Before he dies, Jennings is able relay a message that his killers have taken "the eagle". Acting on a false tip, the police arrest Van Der Lyn for Jennings' murder. A distraught Irene informs Captain Pereira that she was with Van Der Lyn the entire day, but declines to testify against him in court. When she visits Van Der Lyn in jail, he angrily accuses her of framing him.

Van Der Lyn escapes from jail after attacking a guard. Irene finds him and offers to take him to Quintanilla, revealing that she is a resistance fighter as well. His suspicions towards Irene are softened after she gives him a gun. When they reach Quintanilla and the others, they charge him with being a traitor. Van Der Lyn himself concedes that they would be foolish not to kill him. However, when he mentions Jennings' dying message to Quintanilla, they know he must be telling the truth, as "the eagle" was a rare coin that was to have been used to identify Jennings. Hugo is then revealed to be a double agent working with the resistance.

Quintanilla decides to set a trap by informing the group that Jennings' replacement is in the casino hotel, since he knows that the Germans will move to eliminate him to plant their own agent. Pereira spots Van Der Lyn, but is persuaded to trust him and wait a few minutes for the real murderer to be revealed. Quintanilla informs the group that the new agent's room number is 865, and that they will meet him in fifteen minutes. Shortly after, the group gathers at a roulette table along with known Nazi agents. Hugo places bets on 8, 6, and 5, revealing that he is the traitor. Quintanilla and the others escort him away, but he manages to escape and flee the casino. Hugo is pursued by Van Der Lyn and Captain Pereira, who kill him in a shootout. Van Der Lyn finds the eagle coin in one of Hugo's pockets.

Van Der Lyn departs Lisbon on a boat to return to occupied Europe in Jennings' place. Irene promises to wait to learn of his safe passage across the border, and Vincent promises to come back to her.

== Cast ==
- Paul Henreid as Vincent Van Der Lyn
- Hedy Lamarr as Irene Von Mohr
- Sydney Greenstreet as Ricardo Quintanilla
- Peter Lorre as Jan Bernazsky
- Victor Francen as Hugo Von Mohr
- Joseph Calleia as Police Captain Pereira
- Carol Thurston as Rosa, Miguel's daughter
- Vladimir Sokoloff as Miguel, a Portuguese fisherman who helps Van Der Lyn
- Edward Ciannelli as Police Colonel Almeida, Pereira's superior
- Steven Geray as Dr. Schmitt
- Kurt Katch as Otto Lutzke

Uncredited (in order of appearance)

- Gregory Gaye as Anton Wynat
- Edward Van Sloan as Dutchman in cellar
- Doris Lloyd as Mrs. Benson
- Phil Van Zandt as Gomez
- William Edmunds as Souvenir vendor
- John Bleifer as Polish refugee
- Marguerita Sylva as Older woman
- Isabelle LaMal as French refugee
- Leon Belasco as Vincent's waiter
- Frank Reicher as Casino attendant
- Tony Caruso as Young fisherman
- Pedro Regas as Older fisherman
- Martin Garralaga as Detective outside pawnshop
- Dick Botiller as Detective
- Jay Novello as Detective
- Monte Blue as Jennings
- Arno Frey as General's attache
- Beal Wong as Japanese attache
- Luis Alberni as Prison guard
- Saul Gorss as Jorge
- John Mylong as Commandant
- George Macready as Schmitt conman
- Carmel Myers as Baroness von Kluge
- Rafael Storm as Senhor Gamma
- Emil Rameau as Professor Wingby
- Erno Verebes as Portuguese fisherman
- Brooks Benedict
- Sid D'Albrook as Jorge
- Harry Semels as Customs assistant
- Trevor Bardette as Stefan

== Production ==
Production on The Conspirators ran from late April to mid-May 1944. The film's working title was Give Me This Woman. In pre-production, a number of actors were considered for roles in The Conspirators, including Joan Fontaine, Helmut Dantine, Humphrey Bogart, and Ann Sheridan, before Hedy Lamarr was borrowed from MGM for the film to star in the lead female role. Hal B. Wallis had asked Ayn Rand to help rewrite the love scenes in this film for the director, Jean Negulesco. Only a few of Rand's lines were apparently retained in the film, and she is uncredited.

== Reception ==
Bosley Crowther, a film critic for The New York Times, called The Conspirators "a disappointing show. And, indeed, it would be quite as vexing if it came from a less able lot." Savaged by critics, The Conspirators was then reviewed by Frederic Prokosch, the author of the novel on which the film was based, who wrote a brusque critique of it in The New Republic.

== See also ==
- List of American films of 1944
