= Eduard Prokosch =

Austrian-American linguist (1876–1938)

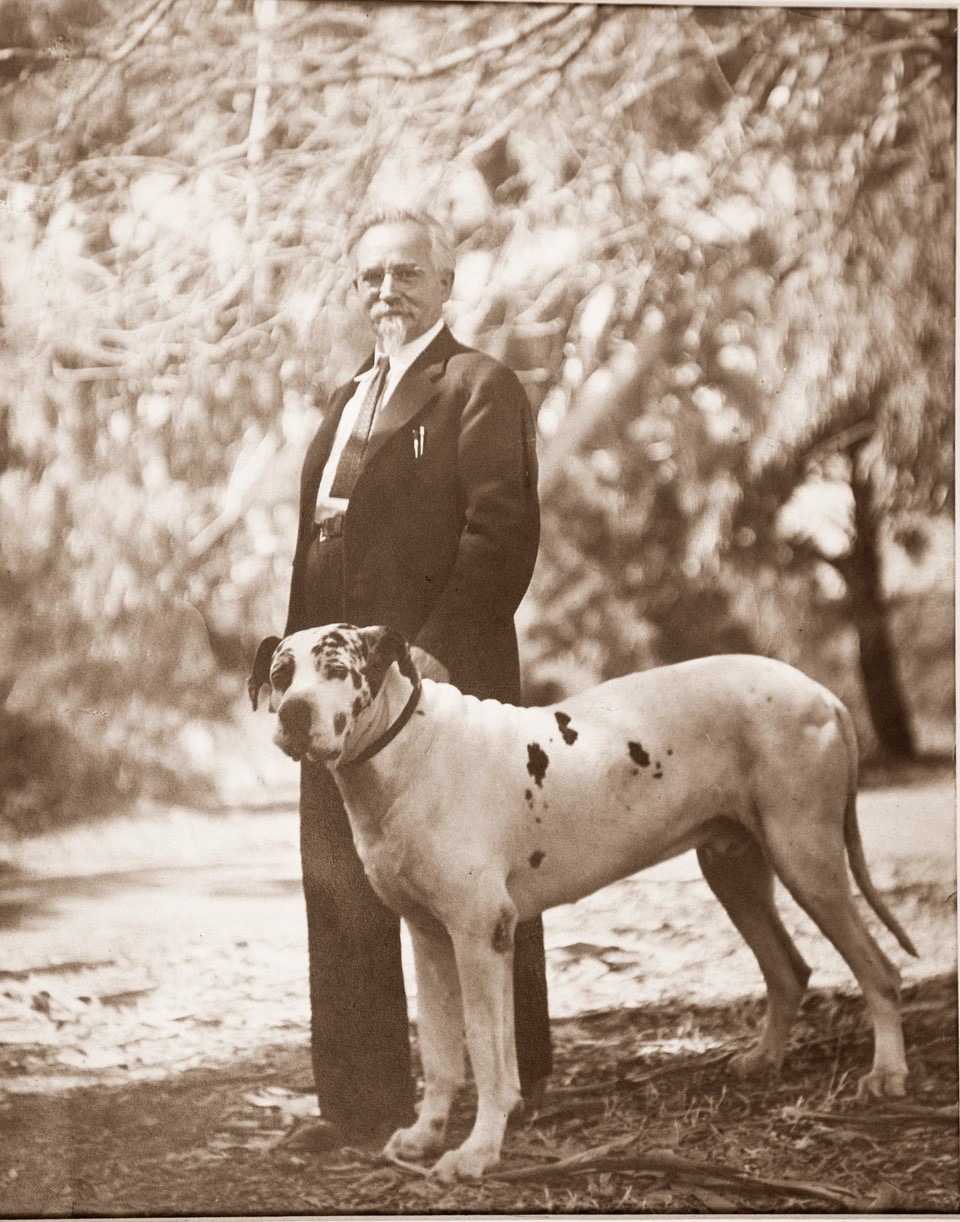
- Prokosch with his dog, Rolf
- Born: May 15, 1876; Eger, Austria-Hungary (now Cheb, Czech Republic)
- Died: August 11, 1938 (aged 62); New Haven, Connecticut

Academic background
- Education: University of Leipzig

Eduard Prokosch (May 15, 1876 – August 11, 1938) was an Austrian-born American historical linguist and educator. He was known for his work in Indo-European and, specifically, Proto-Germanic studies and for his contributions to the teaching of modern languages.

== Biography ==
Prokosch was born in Eger, Bohemia (modern Cheb, Czech Republic), the son of a schoolmaster. He studied jurisprudence at the University of Vienna and passed the state bar examination in 1897. After emigrating to the United States in 1898, he worked for a short time as a reporter for a German-American newspaper in Baltimore before enrolling in the National German-American Teachers' Academy in Milwaukee headed by Emil Dapprich. From there he went to the University of Chicago, where he obtained a master's degree in 1901 and served as an instructor in German.

Prokosch's studies in Milwaukee and Chicago served to develop his approach to linguistic analysis and the teaching of languages. He obtained a doctorate in philology at the University of Leipzig in 1905 and taught at the University of Wisconsin from 1905 to 1913. He became an American citizen in 1904.

Prokosch was appointed professor of Germanic philology and head of the Department of German at the University of Texas in 1913, but he was caught up in the anti-German fervor which swept the country after the United States entered the First World War in 1917. In November 1917 he appeared before a formal investigation to answer the charges lodged by a U.S. Marshall that when asked to sign a wartime food conservation card he had refused, saying that it looked like an advertising scheme, and that "[d]uring the whole conversation he seemed rather angry and gave the impression that he did not regard the plan with much favor". It was also alleged that "on occasions...in the Austin High School...the children of Professor Prokosch refused to or failed to stand during the singing of the [national] anthem, and refused to or failed to salute the Flag, etc."

The pressure intensified in 1918 with the publication of a book by America's former ambassador to Germany, James W. Gerard, denouncing an elementary German textbook by Prokosch for including the words and music of the patriotic German song Die Wacht am Rhein and a description of the German constitution "maliciously" written "to give the impression to school children in America that the German empire instead of being a despotic autocracy, is ruled in very much the same manner as our own republic."

Following pressure from the state legislature and a stream of further accusations, Prokosch was fired in June 1919, after the war had ended. Later in the year, he was offered a position at Bryn Mawr College, remaining there until 1928 and serving concurrently as head of the department of German at New York University from 1927 to 1929. In 1929 he was appointed director of graduate studies in Germanics at Yale University, and in 1931 he was designated Sterling Professor of Germanic Languages. During his time at Yale he wrote his most influential work, A Comparative Germanic Grammar (published posthumously), which broke ground in the fields of Indo-European and Germanic studies.

Prokosch's linguistic research involved the systematic reconstruction of the evolution of the sounds and grammatical forms of Germanic languages from their Indo-European roots.

In his work in language education, Prokosch was a champion of the "direct method", whereby pupils learning a foreign language are made to speak from the start rather than concentrating on the written language. As he explained, "[t]his implies that speaking be treated as the one approach to all aspects of the study - pronunciation, vocabulary and grammar... Grammar is taught inductively and practiced by speaking, with occasional written exercises." In particular, "an inductive study of grammar should develop from the living language, and the grammatical rule should come not first but last, both in order and importance."

Prokosch wrote and published several school textbooks on German based on this method. At the invitation of the University of Chicago Press, he wrote a similar textbook on Russian, using the same method while avoiding the more complicated features of declensions and verb forms. The Cyrillic script proved difficult for the typesetters, and so (he wrote) "The typographical side of the book should be judged with some leniency, since the typesetting was done by the author himself, for whom this was the first venture into Guttenberg's black art."

Prokosch had an immense capacity for learning languages. His school report on graduation from the Eger gymnasium shows that he was deemed "excellent" in Greek, Latin and German and "commendable" in the Czech language. At the University of Chicago he studied Spanish, Old and Middle High German, Sanskrit, Old Norse, Lithuanian, and medieval French literature among other subjects. He was an indefatigable worker: according to the linguist Leonard Bloomfield, he was able to work sixteen hours a day and "forgot nothing that he had attentively heard or read". He was remembered by many of his students as an inspiring teacher. Bloomfield recalled that, as a young man uncertain of his future, he was advised to visit Prokosch, then a young instructor at the University of Wisconsin. "On a small table in Prokosch's dining room there stood a dozen technical books (I seem to remember that Leskien's Old Bulgarian grammar was among them) and in the interval before lunch Prokosch explained to me their use and content. By the time we sat down to the meal, a matter perhaps of fifteen minutes, I had decided that I should always work in linguistics."

At Yale, Prokosch built a cottage, surrounded by a garden, in a wooded area some seven miles from the university. As he wrote in 1934, he would join his family in their home a few miles away for dinner and then retire to his cottage with his steadfast companion, Rolf, a Great Dane descended "from the two most famous Great Dane stocks in existence, Schloss Neustadt and von der Rheinschanze", who attended his classes and would stand up and wait by the door when the lecture was about to end.

Prokosch was the father of the dance ethnologist Gertrude Prokosch Kurath, the writer Frederic Prokosch and the architect Walther Prokosch and father-in-law and former teacher of the linguist Hans Kurath. He died in an automobile accident in New Haven, Connecticut.

== Selected works ==
- The Sounds and History of the German Language. New York, Holt, 1916
- Elementary Russian Grammar. Chicago, University of Chicago Press, 1920
- Eduard Prokosch and Bayard Q. Morgan, An Introduction to German, revised edition. New York, Holt, 1923
- Deutsche Sprach-Lehre. New York, Holt, 1930
- A Comparative Germanic Grammar. Philadelphia, Linguistic Society of America, William Dwight Whitney Linguistic Series, 1939
