= Raven I. McDavid Jr. =

American linguist

Raven Ioor McDavid Jr.
- Born: October 16, 1911; Greenville, SC
- Died: October 21, 1984 (aged 73); Chicago, IL
- Occupation: Linguist

Raven Ioor McDavid Jr. (October 16, 1911 – October 21, 1984) was an American linguist who specialized in dialectology. His works include The Structure of American English, Linguistic Atlas of the Middle and South Atlantic States, The Pronunciation of English in the Atlantic States (with Hans Kurath), and the 1963 single-volume edition of H. L. Mencken's The American Language.

McDavid was born in Greenville, South Carolina, and was an undergraduate at Furman University, from which he received his A.B. in 1931. He went on to graduate school at Duke University, from which he received his M.A. in 1933 and his Ph.D. in 1935. McDavid did further graduate work at the University of Michigan and Yale University.

McDavid was attached to the Army Language Section in New York City during World War II. After the war, he went on to teach at The Citadel, Michigan State University, and Western Reserve University before taking up a position at the University of Chicago in 1957. He would remain at Chicago until he retired in 1977.

McDavid died of a heart attack in Chicago at the age of 73.
