= Gertrude Prokosch Kurath =

American ethnomusicologist (1903–1992)

Gertude Prokosch Kurath
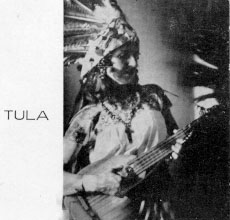
- Born: August 19, 1903; Chicago, Illinois, U.S.
- Died: August 1, 1992 (aged 88)
- Other name: Tula
- Education: Bryn Mawr College (BA, MA); Yale University (MFA)
- Occupations: Dancer, ethnomusicologist
- Website: http://www.ccdr.org

Gertrude Prokosch Kurath (August 19, 1903 – August 1, 1992) was an American dancer, researcher, author, and ethnomusicologist. She researched and wrote extensively on the study of dance, co-authoring several books and writing hundreds of articles. Her main areas of interest were ethnomusicology and dance ethnology, with some of her best known works being "Panorama of Dance Ethnology" in Current Anthropology (1960), the book Music and dance of the Tewa Pueblos co-written with Antonio Garcia (1970), and Iroquois Music and Dance: ceremonial arts of two Seneca Longhouses (1964), in the Smithsonian Institution Bureau of American Ethnology bulletin. She made substantial contributions to the study of Amerindian dance, and to dance theory. From 1958 to January 1972 she was dance editor for the journal Ethnomusicology.

== Biography ==
Gertrude Prokosch was born on August 19, 1903, in Chicago, Illinois. She was the daughter of Eduard Prokosch, a historical linguist, and sister to the writer Frederic Prokosch and the architect Walther Prokosch. She graduated from Bryn Mawr College, receiving a BA in 1922, and an MA in art history in 1928, concurrently studying music and dance in Berlin, Philadelphia, New York, and Providence, Rhode Island from 1922 to 1928. She then studied music and dance at the Yale School of Drama at Yale University, from 1929 to 1930. She danced under the stage name of Tula, starting in 1922. From 1923 to 1946 she was a teacher, performer, producer, and choreographer of modern dance. In the mid-1940s, she turned her focus to the study of American Indian dance, doing extensive fieldwork on the musical traditions of Michigan's Anishinaabe and others. She was awarded grants for field research by the Wenner-Gren Foundation from 1949 to 1973, the American Philosophical Society from 1951 to 1965, and the National Museum of Canada (1962–1965, 1969–1970). She wrote about Iroquois, Pueblo, Six Nations, and Great Lakes Indian dances, as well as on the subjects of dance theory and methods. In 1962, she founded the Dance Research Center in Ann Arbor, Michigan.

Her other scholarly interests included the fields of folk liturgy and rock music. Robert Commanday of the San Francisco Chronicle praised her addition to The New Grove Dictionary of American Music, saying, "For the first time in the country's history, a comprehensive survey of its music and musicians is available in a single reference work. It encompasses the spectrum, the fields of concert, opera, traditional, folk and popular music, and areas related to and touching on American music in every conceivable way - industry, technology, education, religion, literature.... Two treatments must be singled out as unique and outstanding. One is the 20-page study on "Indians, American" by Bruno Nettl and Charlotte Heth on the music, Gertrude Kurath on the dance. In addition, there are separate articles on the music of nearly 40 tribes and tribal groups. Equally impressive is the 22-page article on 'European-American Music', treating in sequence the musical cultures and influences here of 19 European countries."

Kurath died on August 1, 1992, just a few months after the death of her husband, linguist Hans Kurath. Her archives are maintained at Cross-Cultural Dance Resources in Arizona, which published her work Half a Century of Dance Research. The Iroquois materials are housed in the Woodlands Cultural Centre in Brantford, Ontario.

== Honors ==
- 1972, CORD (Congress on Research in Dance)
- 1986, UCLA Association of Graduate Dance Ethnologists
- 1987, Society for Ethnomusicology
- 2001, (posthumously), Society for Ethnomusicology
- 2001, (posthumously) Michigan State University Museum Heritage Award

== Selected works ==
- Kurath, Gertrude Prokosch; Garcia, Antonio. Music and Dance of the Tewa Pueblos, 1970
- Gertrude Prokosch Kurath / Jane Ettawageshik / Fred Ettawageshik / Michael D. McNally / Frank Ettawageshik, Sacred Music, Dance, and Myth of Michigan's Anishinaabe, 1946–1955
- Kurath, Gertrude Prokosch. Half a Century of Dance Research
- Helm, June, Nancy Oestreich Lurie, and Gertrude Prokosch Kurath. The Dogrib Hand Game. Ottawa: [Queen's Printer], 1966.
- Kurath, Gertrude Prokosch (Jul–Sep 1956). "Dance Relatives of Mid-Europe and Middle America: A Venture in Comparative Choreology". The Journal of American Folklore. 69 (273, Slavic Folklore: A Symposium). American Folklore Society: 286–298. doi:10.2307/537145. ISSN 0021-8715. JSTOR 537145.
- Kurath, Gertrude Prokosch (Apr–Jun 1998). "Mexican Moriscas: A Problem in Dance Acculturation". The Journal of American Folklore. 62 (244). American Folklore Society: 87–106. doi:10.2307/536304. ISSN 0021-8715. JSTOR 536304.
- "Panorama of Dance Ethnology" in Current Anthropology 1960, vol. 1, no. 3, pp. 233–254
- Music and dance of the Tewa Pueblos with Antonio Garcia, Museum of New Mexico Press, Santa Fe, NM, 1970
- "Iroquois Music and Dance: ceremonial arts of two Seneca Longhouses", Smithsonian Institution Bureau of American Ethnology bulletin 187, 1964
- Recorded the Ethnic Folkways Library record Songs and Dances of Great Lakes Indians 1956, #FM 4003, Folkways Records & Services Corp.
