= Linguistic value =

In artificial intelligence, fuzzy logic operations research, and related fields, a linguistic value is a natural language term which is derived using quantitative or qualitative reasoning such as with probability and statistics or fuzzy sets and systems. Variables that take linguistic values are called linguistic variables.

== Examples of linguistic variables and values ==
For example, "age" may be a linguistic variable if its values are not numerical, e.g. very young, quite young, not young, old, not very old etc. These values could be derived from the numeric values for age.

As another example, if a shuttle heat shield is deemed of having a linguistic value of a "very low" percentage of damage in re-entry, based upon knowledge from experts in the field, that probability would be given a value of say, 5%. From there on out, if it were to be used in an equation, the variable of percentage of damage will be at 5% if it deemed very low percentage.
