= Frederic Prokosch =

American poet

Frederic Prokosch (May 17, 1906 – June 2, 1989) was an American writer, known for his novels, poetry, memoirs and criticism. He was also a distinguished translator.

== Biography ==
Prokosch was born in Madison, Wisconsin, into an intellectual family that travelled widely. His father, Eduard Prokosch, an Austrian immigrant, was Professor of Germanic Languages at Yale University at the time of his death in 1938, his sister Gertrude Prokosch Kurath was a dancer and a prominent ethnomusicologist and his brother Walther Prokosch was a distinguished architect. Prokosch graduated from Haverford College in 1925 and, following a period of postgraduate research at the University of Pennsylvania and King's College, Cambridge, received a Ph.D. in English in 1932 from Yale University. In his youth, he was an accomplished squash racquets player; he represented the Yale Club in the 1937 New York State squash racquets championship. He won the squash-racquets championship of France in 1938.

Prokosch had originally intended to become a literary scholar, and after receiving his doctorate from Yale he was employed as an instructor in English at New York University. However, upon returning to Cambridge in 1937 to embark on postdoctoral work he became disillusioned, and soon abandoned his research in favor of becoming a writer. During World War II, Prokosch was a cultural attaché at the American Legation in Sweden. He spent most of the remainder of his life in Europe, where he led a peripatetic existence. His interests were sports (tennis and squash), lepidoptery, and the printing of limited editions of poems that he admired.

From early on, Prokosch sought to surround himself with a veil of mystification and cast his life into a hopeless riddle. Approaching his sixtieth year, he boasted that no person had succeeded in knowing him as an integral personality: "I have spent my life alone, utterly alone, and no biography of me could ever more than scratch the surface. All the facts in Who’s Who, or whatever, are so utterly meaningless. My real life (if I ever dared to write it!) has transpired in darkness, secrecy, fleeting contacts and incommunicable delights, any number of strange picaresque escapades and even crimes, and I don't think that any of my 'friends' have even the faintest notion of what I'm really like or have any idea of what my life has really consisted of. . . .With all the surface 'respectability,' diplomatic and scholarly and illustrious social contacts, my real life has been subversive, anarchic, vicious, lonely, and capricious."

The publication of Voices: A Memoir in 1983, advertised as a record of his encounters with some of the century's leading artists and writers, returned Prokosch to the limelight. His early novels The Asiatics and The Seven Who Fled were reissued to much public acclaim. In 2010, Voices was shown to be almost wholly fictitious and part of an enormous hoax. Prokosch died in Le Plan-de-Grasse, an area of Grasse, France.

== Literary work ==
Prokosch's novels The Asiatics and The Seven Who Fled received widespread attention in the 1930s. The action in both of these narratives takes place in Asia, a continent Prokosch had not visited but wrote about from his imagination and from books and maps. Landscape descriptions are so prevalent that the landscape often takes on the role of a character in its own right. Albert Camus said about The Seven Who Fled, "Prokosch has invented what might be called the geographical novel, in which he mingles sensuality with irony, lucidity with mystery. He conveys a fatalistic sense of life half hidden beneath a rich animal energy. He is a master of moods and undertones, a virtuoso in the feeling of place, and he writes in a style of supple elegance."

The New York Times critic L. H. Titterton wrote about The Asiatics:

"Whether such adventures ever happened to any one man, or whether, as seems far more likely, the author has supplemented certain experiences of his own by a rich imagination, using as its basis information gathered through wide reading, is immaterial. For this is actually a quiet, meditative book into which adventurous episodes have been introduced simply as a device for displaying various aspects of the Asiatic mind and spirit. It is the work of a man of a deeply poetic nature possessed of an astonishing ability to describe in a few words a color, a scene, an odor, an emotional situation, an attitude of mind, an idea; words so well chosen that passage after passage seems perfectly to express some truth that we have many times, in a stumbling way, attempted to state.

Writing in The New York Times, Harold Strauss said about The Seven Who Fled (which won the Harper Prize):

In singing, supple prose, with an evocative power strange to our earthbound ears, with passion and often with fury, Frederic Prokosch takes us off to the vast, mysterious reaches of Central Asia. It is a weird adventure of the spirit on which he leads us. For, mistake not, despite the apparently realistic description of the endless reaches of the desert, of the topless towers of the snow-capped mountains, of the huddling villages in which men rot away in poverty and disease, this Central Asia of Prokosch's is not an actual place upon the face of the earth. Like Xanadu, like Arcadia, like Atlantis or Aea [sic] or Poictesme, it is a phantom manufactured by a restless mind. ...Whatever the meaning of this book, and there will be much debate on that score, its wild lyrinative splendor and its profound emotional content mark it as a memorable novel.

After the 1930s, popular interest in Prokosch's writing declined, but he continued to write steadily and to solidify his reputation as a writer’s writer with an elite following that included Thomas Mann, André Gide, Sinclair Lewis, Albert Camus, Thornton Wilder, Dylan Thomas, Anthony Burgess, Raymond Queneau, Somerset Maugham, Lawrence Durrell, Gore Vidal, and T.S. Eliot. “Pondering about Prokosch and his fate, I have come to the conclusion,” wrote Isaac Bashevis Singer, “that he is himself in a way at fault for being so woefully neglected. He has not cared to husband his natural riches... His roots are in this land. If Prokosch, like Faulkner, had limited his creative energies to one milieu, one region, he would certainly be counted today among the pillars of American literature.”

Among the most noteworthy of Prokosch’s latter-day writings are The Idols of the Cave (1946), a sophisticated story about a circle of aesthetes and socialites in New York City through the war years; Nine Days to Mukalla (1953), a dreamlike journey into the Arabian world; A Tale for Midnight (1955), a Gothicized retelling of the Cenci story; The Wreck of the Cassandra (1966), a realistic and poetic story of nine people castaway on a savage island; The Missolonghi Manuscript (1968), a “meditation” on the romantic artist; and America, My Wilderness (1972), an excursion into magical realism. Prokosch was named a Commander in the Ordre des Arts et Lettres by the French government in 1984 and awarded the Volterra Prize two years later. His novels have been translated into 15 languages.

== Works ==
- The Asiatics (1935), novel
- The Assassins (1936), poems
- The Seven Who Fled (1937), novel
- The Carnival (1938), poems
- Night of the Poor (1939), novel
- Death at Sea (1940), poems
- The Skies of Europe (1941), novel
- The Conspirators (1943), novel (made into a movie of the same name in 1944)
- Some poems of Friedrich Hoelderlin (1943), translator
- Chosen Poems (1945), poems
- Chosen Poems (1947, in the United States), poems
- Age of Thunder (1945), novel
- The Idols of the Cave (1946), novel
- Louise Labé, Love sonnets (1947), translator
- Storm and Echo (1948), novel
- Nine days to Mukalla (1953), novel
- Fire Song (1955), poems
- A Tale for Midnight (1955), novel
- Under the Winter Moon (1958), novel, written under the pseudonym of "Teresa Brooke"
- Mother Was Always in Love (1960), novel by Philip Van Rensselaer and Frederic Prokosch, uncredited author
- A Ballad of Love (1960), novel
- The Seven Sisters (1962), novel
- The Dark Dancer (1964), novel
- The Wreck of the Cassandra (1966), novel
- The Missolonghi Manuscript (1968), novel
- America, My Wilderness (1972), novel
- Voices: a Memoir (1983), fictional autobiography
