= Ernst Pulgram =

American linguist

- Born: September 18, 1915; Vienna, Austria-Hungary
- Died: August 17, 2005 (aged 89); Cushendun, Northern Ireland
- Occupations: Linguist, professor
- Spouse: Frances McSparran
- Relatives: William Pulgram (brother)
- Awards: Guggenheim Fellowship (1954),(1962)

Academic background
- Education: University of Vienna (PhD); Harvard University (PhD)
- Influences: Paul Kretschmer; Elise Richter; Nikolai Trubetzkoy; Joshua Whatmough

Academic work
- Discipline: Romance linguistics
- Institutions: University of Michigan

Ernst Pulgram (September 18, 1915 – August 17, 2005) was an American linguist of Austrian origins whose main interest lay in the Italic and Romance languages. He was married to linguist Frances McSparran.

Born and educated in Vienna, he was forced to leave shortly after the Anschluss to escape from the Nazis. He moved to the United States and joined the US army to fight in World War II. Because he had left Vienna a few days before his PhD defence and thus was not able to complete the degree, shortly after the war Pulgram started a new PhD at Harvard University under the G.I. Bill. After graduation, he spent most of his career (1948–1986) at the University of Michigan. Throughout his life, he maintained ties to his Austrian homeland, which included in later years several Viennese linguists (such as historical English linguist Herbert Schendl).

One obituary read that Pulgram's death meant that "the last of the great Romanists who had to flee from the Nazis and went to the States, is gone." Pulgram held Visiting Professorships at universities in Florence, Cologne, Heidelberg, Regensburg, Vienna, Innsbruck, Munich, and Tokyo.

== Bibliography ==
- The Tongues of Italy, Prehistory and History
- Latin-romance phonology: Prosodics and metrics (Ars grammatica)
- Applied Linguistics in Language Teaching
- Italic, Latin, Italian: 600 B.C. to A.D. 1260 : texts and commentaries; (Indogermanische Bibliothek. Reihe 1, Lehr und Handbücher)
- Practicing linguist: Essays on language and languages, 1950-1985
