= Hans Kurath =

American linguist (1891–1992)

- Born: December 13, 1891; Villach, Austria-Hungary
- Died: January 2, 1992 (aged 100); Ann Arbor, Michigan, U.S.
- Citizenship: Austria-Hungary; United States (from 1912)
- Spouse: Gertrude Prokosch
- Relatives: Eduard Prokosch (father-in-law); Frederic Prokosch (brother-in-law)

Hans Kurath (December 13, 1891 – January 2, 1992) was an Austrian-American linguist. He was full professor for English and Linguistics at the University of Michigan, Ann Arbor. The many varieties of regional English that he encountered during his trips convinced him of the necessity of completing a systematic study of American English.

In 1926, he convinced the Modern Language Association to begin planning for the project, and in 1931, a pilot study of the New England region was initiated under his direction, eventually producing the Linguistic Atlas of New England. It soon became clear, however, that the undertaking was too complex to be completed by a single team of linguists. The project was thus expanded to eight additional regional operations.

Kurath guided the vision and goals of the regional projects for three decades and oversaw the publication of a series of volumes that are known collectively as the Linguistic Atlas of the United States, the first linguistic atlas of the US. For that work, he received the Loubat Prize. His most influential contribution was his 1949 three-part division of American English dialects into North, Midland, and South, which identified 18 distinct speech areas in the Eastern United States and remains foundational to American dialectology.

He was also the first main editor of the Middle English Dictionary. Together with Raven I. McDavid, Jr., he published a linguistic atlas of the Eastern United States, The Pronunciation of English in the Atlantic States.

== Life ==
Kurath was born in Villach, Austria-Hungary. He emigrated to the United States in 1907 and became a US citizen in 1912. He studied at the Universities of Texas and Chicago. He did his Ph.D. in 1920. Afterwards, he became professor in German at Northwestern University (1920–1927) and then professor for German and Linguistics at the Ohio State University (1927–1931) and Brown University (1931–1946).

In 1946, he became full professor for English and Linguistics at the University of Michigan, Ann Arbor (1946–1962). In 1941, he was president of the Linguistic Society of America. In 1959, he received an honorary doctorate from the University of Chicago.

He died in Ann Arbor, Michigan, at the age of 100. His wife was the dance ethnologist Gertrude Prokosch Kurath, daughter of Eduard Prokosch, a historical linguist.

== Methodology ==
Kurath's chief research interest was historical linguistics and his primary goal was to use the Linguistic Atlas to reconstruct the evolution of American English from the relatively "pure" forms of English brought to the United States by the early settlers to the regional dialects that existed in the contemporary United States. Kurath was convinced that language held a living record of events like the growth of trade and transport systems, urbanization, and population movements. By plotting regional differences in vocabulary and pronunciation on maps, Kurath and other researchers assembled what they hoped was a visual record of the social processes that had transformed American English over the past 200 years.

Each regional operation used similar techniques: a small team of linguists fanned out across the region interviewing at least two people in every county. For the Linguistic Atlas of New England, 416 informants were interviewed in 213 communities across the New England states from 1931 to 1933. The Linguistic Atlas of the Middle and South Atlantic States covered 1,162 records from the St. Lawrence Valley to northeastern Florida.

Kurath gave the researchers explicit instructions about the types of informants who were considered appropriate for the project. In every town or city selected for the project, at least two people would be chosen, one had to be "old-fashioned and unschooled," Kurath suggested a farmer or a farmer's wife, and the other should be "a member of the middle class who has had the benefit of a grade-school or high-school education". The communities themselves were also carefully screened. Kurath placed a priority on towns that were early American settlements or could be directly linked to them through historical records.

Responses to the questionnaires, which contained over 700 items covering vocabulary, grammar, and pronunciation, were recorded in phonetic transcription using the International Phonetic Alphabet.

== Legacy and impact ==
Kurath's work laid the groundwork for modern American dialectology and sociolinguistics. His identification of the three primary speech areas North, Midland, and South along with the discovery of the Midland region as a distinct dialect area, represents one of his most significant contributions to the field. The fundamental divisions he and Raven I. McDavid, Jr. established, and the connections they made with settlement history, continue to be validated by contemporary linguistic research.

The Linguistic Atlas Project, which Kurath founded in 1929 at the behest of the American Dialect Society, remains the most thorough and expansive study of American English undertaken to date. The project continues today at the University of Georgia, where over 5,000 interviews have been conducted and researchers continue to digitize and analyze the extensive data collected over decades of fieldwork.

Kurath's methodological innovations, including his systematic approach to informant selection and his use of cartographic representation of linguistic data, established standards for dialect research that influenced subsequent atlas projects worldwide. His work demonstrated that American English was not a homogeneous entity but rather a complex tapestry of regional varieties shaped by historical migration patterns, settlement history, and social processes.

== Selected works ==
- Kurath, Hans; Miles L. Hanley; Bernard Bloch; Guy S. Lowman; Marcus L. Hansen; Julia Bloch (1939–1943). Linguistic Atlas of New England. Vol. 3 vols. Providence: Brown University for the American Council of Learned Societies.
- Kurath, Hans; Miles L. Hanley (1939). Handbook of the Linguistic Geography of New England. Providence: Brown University for the American Council of Learned Societies.
- Kurath, Hans (1949). A Word Geography of the Eastern United States. Ann Arbor: University of Michigan Press.
- Kurath, Hans, ed. (1946–1962). Middle English Dictionary. Ann Arbor: University of Michigan Press.
- Kurath, Hans; Raven I. McDavid, Jr. (1961). The Pronunciation of English in the Atlantic States. Ann Arbor: University of Michigan Press.
