= Ilia Peiros =

Russian linguist (born 1948)

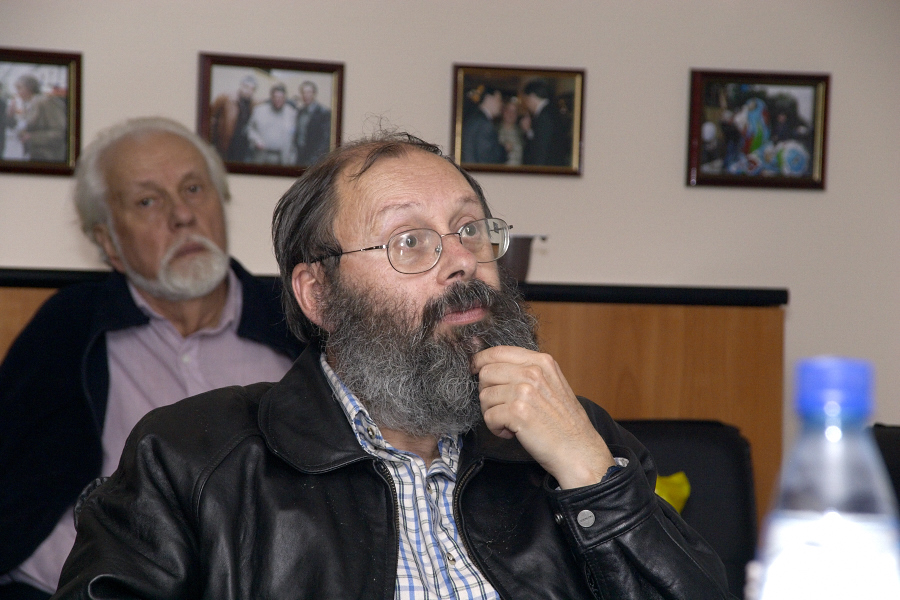
- Peiros in 2004
- Born: Ilia Iosifovich Peiros; Илья Иосифович Пейрос; 1948 (age 77–78); Soviet Union

Academic background
- Education: Moscow State University

Academic work
- Discipline: Linguist
- School or tradition: Moscow School of Comparative Linguistics
- Institutions: Santa Fe Institute
- Main interests: Historical linguistics; East Asian languages

Ilia Iosifovich Peiros (Russian: Илья Иосифович Пейрос; born 1948) is a Russian linguist who specializes in the historical linguistics of East Asia. Peiros is a well-known scholar in the Moscow School of Comparative Linguistics, known for its work on long-range comparative linguistics. Peiros is affiliated with the Santa Fe Institute in New Mexico, United States and was also a former faculty member at the University of Melbourne.

== Education ==
In 1971, Peiros graduated from the Department of Theoretical and Applied Linguistics at Moscow State University. In 1976, he defended his Ph.D. thesis on Sino-Tibetan consonantism.

== Career ==
In the article "An Austric Macrofamily: some considerations", Peiros proposed that Austro-Tai (comprising Austronesian and Tai-Kadai), Miao-Yao (Hmong-Mien), and Austroasiatic were all related to each other as part of the Austric language macrofamily.

In 1996, together with Sergei Starostin, he published a 6-volume comparative dictionary of the Sino-Tibetan languages.

Peiros also does research on Amerindian historical linguistics as part of the Evolution of Human Languages (EHL) project, led by Georgiy Starostin.

== Selected publications ==
- Peiros, Ilia (1989). "Some Enhancements for the Reconstruction of Proto-Karen" (PDF). Historical Accentology and the Comparative Method. Moscow: Nauka: 225–254.
- Peiros, Ilia. 1998. Comparative Linguistics in Southeast Asia. Pacific Linguistics, Research School of Pacific and Asian Studies, Australian National University.
- Comrie, Bernard and Ilia Peiros. 2000. "Austroasiatic and Tai-Kadai Languages in the Intercontinental Dictionary Series." In The Fifth International Symposium on Languages and Linguistics, Ho Chi Minh City, 89-117. Vietnam National University, Ho Chi Minh City University of Social Sciences and Humanities.
- Peiros, Ilia. 1997. "Lolo-Burmese Linguistic Archaeology." In Mon-Khmer Studies, 27: 233–248.
- Jukes, Anthony and Ilia Peiros. 1996. "A Katuic Cultural Reconstruction." In The Fourth International Symposium on Language and Linguistics, Thailand, 827–849. Institute of Language and Culture for Rural Development, Mahidol University.
- Peiros, Ilia. 1996. "The Vietnamese Etymological Dictionary and 'new' Language Families." In The Fourth International Symposium on Language and Linguistics, Thailand, 883–894. Institute of Language and Culture for Rural Development, Mahidol University.
