= Journal of Language Relationship =

- Discipline: Historical linguistics
- Language: English, Russian, French, and German

Publication details
- History: 2009–present
- Publisher: Russian State University for the Humanities (RSUH); Institute of Linguistics of the Russian Academy of Sciences; Gorgias Press (Russia and the United States)
- Frequency: Quarterly

Standard abbreviations
- ISO 4: J. Lang. Relatsh.

Indexing
- ISSN: 2219-3820 (print); 2219-4029 (web)

Links
- Journal homepage

The Journal of Language Relationship (abbreviated JLR; Russian: Вопросы языкового родства) is a quarterly academic journal published in Russia and the United States. It focuses on historical linguistics, with many articles relating to long-range comparative linguistics.

== Overview ==
In 2008, Kirill Babaev founded the journal in Moscow. The journal is currently published by the Russian State University for the Humanities (RSUH) and the Institute of Linguistics of the Russian Academy of Sciences in Moscow, and by Gorgias Press in the United States. The journal is open access.

Editors (past and current) include Vladimir Dybo (editor-in-chief, 2009–2023), George Starostin (editor-in-chief, 2024–present), Anna Dybo, Ilya Yakubovich, Kirill Babaev, and others. The advisory board includes (as of 2020) Heiner Eichner (chairman), William H. Baxter, Alexander Militarev, Valentin Vydrin, Václav Blažek, Murray Gell-Mann, Larry Hyman, Frederik Kortlandt, and James P. Mallory.
