= Christopher Ehret =

American historian and linguist

- Born: 27 July 1941
- Died: 25 March 2025 (aged 83); Thousand Oaks, California
- Occupations: Historian, linguist
- Spouse: Patricia Ehret

Academic background
- Education: Northwestern University

Academic work
- Institutions: University of California, Los Angeles
- Main interests: Afroasiatic languages, Nilo-Saharan languages, historical linguistics
- Notable works: Reconstructing Proto-Afroasiatic (Proto-Afrasian) (2005)

Christopher Paul Ehret (27 July 1941 – 25 March 2025) was an American scholar of African history and African historical linguistics who was particularly known for his efforts to correlate linguistic taxonomy and reconstruction with the archeological record. He was a professor at UCLA for almost half a century and published a great multitude of works, including Reconstructing Proto-Afrasian (1995) and Ancient Africa (2023). He authored around seventy articles on a range of historical, linguistic, and anthropological subjects. These works include monographic articles on Bantu subclassification; on internal reconstruction in Semitic; on the reconstruction of proto-Cushitic and proto-Eastern Cushitic; and, with Mohamed Nuuh Ali, on the classification of the Somali languages.

Ehret contributed to a number of encyclopedias on African topics and on world history, such as Volume III of UNESCO General History of Africa book series for which he wrote a chapter on the East African interior.

== Career ==
Ehret's historical books emphasize early African history. In An African Classical Age (1998) he argued for a conception of the period from 1000 BC to 400 AD in East Africa as a "classical age" during which a variety of major technologies and social structures first took shape. His Civilizations of Africa: A History to 1800 (2002), brings together the whole of African history from the close of the last ice age down to the end of the eighteenth century. With the archaeologist Merrick Posnansky, he also edited The Archaeological and Linguistic Reconstruction of African History (1982), at that time a state-of-the-field survey of the correlation of linguistic and archaeological findings in the different major regions of the continent.

The historian Esperanza Brizuela-Garcia, in her review of The Civilizations of Africa for the African Studies Review, calls this book "challenging and innovative" for presenting "the early history of Africa within the context of wide historical processes such as the development of agriculture, the emergence of metalwork, and the evolution of trade…. It gives these themes a thorough and masterful treatment…. By looking at broad themes of the history of human experience, Ehret is able to explain what makes Africa unique and what makes it comparable to other continents.” She concludes: "The most important achievement of Ehret’s book is that finally the early history of the continent is taken seriously and is presented in detail and form that do justice to its complexity and depth. One hopes that Christopher Ehret has initiated a new trend in the writing of African history textbooks, one that challenges previously accepted chronologies and ideas and presents us with an interpretation that connects social, economic, political, and cultural history.”

Scott MacEachern's review of the same book for the Journal of Africa History adds an archaeologist's perspective: "The book is well written and comprehensive and abundantly illustrates the richness and complexity of African societies over many thousands of years. More discussion of methodologies and data compatibility, and a more complete reference list, would have been useful. It will make a fine introductory text for courses in African history, especially if supplemented by books and papers that reflect other research methods and their results.”

In later years Ehret carried his work in several new directions, including the history and evolution of early human kinship systems. He also was interested in applying the methods of historical reconstruction from linguistic evidence to issues in anthropological theory and in world history, and he collaborated with geneticists in seeking to correlate linguistic with genetic findings (e.g., Sarah A. Tishkoff, Floyd A. Reed, F. R. Friedlaender, Christopher Ehret, Alessia Ranciaro, et al., "The Genetic Structure and History of Africans and African Americans", Science 324, 22 May 2009). He was also engaged in developing mathematical tools for dating linguistic history (e.g., Andrew Kitchen, Christopher Ehret, Shiferew Assefa, and Connie Mulligan, "Bayesian phylogenetic analysis of Semitic languages identifies an Early Bronze Age origin of Semitic in the Near East," Proceedings of the Royal Society B: Biological Sciences, July 2009).

Ehret died on 25 March 2025.

=== An African Classical Age ===
In reviewing An African Classical Age for the Annals of the American Academy of Political and Social Science, Ronald Atkinson calls it "not easy or light reading", but concludes that "the result is a remarkably rich, evocative social and cultural history…” and that it "will itself become a classic and shape future scholarship in early African history for many years to come.” The late Kennell Jackson of Stanford, writing in The Historian, says that "by the book’s midpoint, the immensity of his synthesis becomes apparent, as well as Ehret’s achievement as a historical conceptualizer. He repeatedly challenges formulaic ideas about causality, linearity as a model of change, and the cultural factors affecting innovation…. Ehret has written a fabulous African history book, furthering a genre far from the seemingly ubiquitous slavery studies and trendy colonial social history.”

Peter Robertshaw, in the Journal of the Royal Anthropological Institute, offers a more measured conclusion: "Ehret has produced a remarkably coherent and detailed history which should spur further research.” Mitchell also expressed a hope that critical analysis of the text may help “bring archaeological and historical linguistic perspectives into a closer dialogue.” Moreover, the archaeologist Graham Connah described the work as “a rich source of potential research objectives, because it makes repeated predictions of areas and subjects that would repay archaeological investigation.” According to Connah, “there can be no doubt that this is an important book and that it is also a courageous one.” Connah further affirms the ultimate conclusion of the work, stating that Ehret is “undoubtedly” justified in “identifying an African 'Classical Age,' from 1000 b.c. to a.d. 400, that was of significance in the context of world history.” However, Connah also suggests that Ehret's proposal will inevitably require "revision."

The anthropologist N. Thomas Håkansson suggested that the text—should its findings be substantiated by later research—would be as “likely to become as classic as the age it describes” and called its findings “new and illuminating.” Nevertheless, Håkansson still criticized Ehret for a purported lack of appropriate caution in attempting to reconstruct kinship systems utilizing historical linguistics. The philologist Andrzej Zaborski argues that Ehret had improperly presented his linguistic data, failing to adequately convey which theories were dubious, speculative, or proven, and omitting relevant data regarding attested words, thereby preventing any professional philologists from easily assessing his theories. Similarly, Connah states that—for archaeologists such as himself—evidence from historical linguistics “is regrettably in the ‘black box’ category, that is to say, it is mysterious and difficult to evaluate.” According to Zaborski, Ehret's reconstructions may only seem accurate to a non-specialist in the field of philology, but they are still often "untenable from a linguistic point of view." Moreover, Zaborski argues that Ehret often improperly utilized evidence of lexical borrowings between languages families to justify proposed migrations of people and cultural concepts.

Zaborski labels the dates utilized by Ehret as “fictitious,” and he compares Ehret’s methodology to that of the controversial theory of glottochronology. Ehret himself claims not to have used glottochronology, but to have instead employed linguistic evidence in tandem with radiocarbon dating from archaeological sites. Regardless, the archaeologist Peter Mitchell still criticized Ehret for a purported “chronological looseness,” arguing that “few, if any at all,” of Ehret’s methods of dating linguistic developments would “stand up to independent assessment.” Nevertheless, Zaborski states that "Ehret has done a lot of positive things in linguistics" and that he admires "Ehret's skill in creating a vision of African prehistory.

=== Afro-Asiatic studies ===
In his 1995 book Reconstructing Proto-Afroasiatic (Proto-Afrasian): Vowels, Tone, Consonants, and Vocabulary, Ehret intended — according to his own preface - to provide a comprehensive reconstruction of Proto-Afrasiatic phonology. The project has been noted as ambitious. Ekkehard Wolff, scholar of Afroasiatic languages, writes: "Ehrets opus magnum ist ein Parforce-Ritt durch schwierigstes Terrain, bei dem sich der Reiter auch an die steilsten Hindernissen überraschend gut in Sattel hält und an nur einer einzigen Hürde nach Meinung des Rez. scheitert (...Tonalität). Es ist ein nahezu unmöglisches, ein sehr mutiges und ein möglicherweise epochales Buch.” ("Ehret’s opus magnum is a steeplechase ride through the most difficult terrain, in which the rider stays in the saddle astonishingly well even at the steepest obstacles and, in the opinion of the reviewer, crashes at only a single hurdle (…tone). It is a nearly impossible, a very courageous, and a possibly epochal book.”) Wolff concludes: "Ehret hat nichts weniger versucht als einen zukünftigen "Klassiker" zu schreiben....” ("Ehret has sought to write nothing less than a future classic.").

Most reviews have been less positive. Linguist Alan S. Kaye concluded, in his review of the work, that "Ehret's ideas about PAA will not be the standard ones" and that it had largely failed in its objective to provide a "systematic, comprehensive, and rigorous" reconstruction of Proto-Afroasiatic. Philologist Gene Gragg criticized the work, arguing that it rarely cited "the sources for any given word or reconstruction," which — according to Gragg — severely compromised the utility of the text for other linguists. Regarding its sources, Kaye critiqued Ehret for a supposed excessive reliance on the 1884 Arabic-English Dictionary by Francis Joseph Steingass, which Kaye considers to be an unreliable work. Moreover, Gragg argued that many of Ehret's proposed reconstructions relied on accepting the cognancy of terms with divergent semantics. As an example, Gragg cites a case where a Proto-Afroasiatic root meaning "to curve" is reconstructed on the strength of Semitic, Chadic, and Omotic terms meaning "moon," "snake," and "ear." On this basis, Gragg concludes that many of Ehret's reconstructions may be disproven by a more thorough analysis of each individual cognate set, which would itself challenge the broader arguments presented in his work. Furthermore, Gragg notes that Ehret relied heavily on the reconstruction of Proto-Afroasiatic biconsonantal roots with root extensions, an interpretation which is itself not unproblematic nor widely accepted. Kaye likewise criticized the semantic justification for many of Ehret's proposed root extensions as well as for supposedly—according to Kaye—ignoring more modern research on biconsonantal roots. Frederik Kortlandt, another linguist, also expressed doubts regarding the reliability of Ehret's reconstructions, arguing that "there appears to be a large gap between Ehret's far-reaching claims and the available data supporting them."

Despite his criticisms, Gragg still praised the work for "drawing attention to an important, and neglected, facet of Afroasiatic etymology." Similarly, Kortlandt dubbed the book a "major contribution to the reconstruction of Proto-Afro-Asiatic" as it had synthesized significant quantities of data and—according to Kortlandt—presented "a coherent view of how the protolanguage disintegrated and developed into the separate branches of the family." Kortlandt did, however, still consider the reconstructions presented in the dictionary to be generally inaccurate, though he argued that such errors "reflect the state of the art." Ultimately, Kortlandt compared the work to that Julius Pokorny and his Indogermanisches etymologisches Wörterbuch, a text that, although important for the history of Indo-European studies, is now regarded as outdated.

This particular book appeared in the same year as another comparative work on the same language family, Vladimir Oryol and Olga Stolbova's Hamito-Semitic Etymological Dictionary: Materials for a Reconstruction. Two reviewers have given comparative assessments of the two books, John Greppin in the Times Literary Supplement, 1 November 1996, and Robert Ratcliffe in a paper, "Afroasiatic Comparative Lexica: Implications for Long (and Medium) Range Language Comparison.” Greppin writes a strongly positive review; Ratcliffe takes a more negative stance toward both books. Unlike Oryol and Stolbova, Ehret generally relegated evidence from Proto-Berber to a more minor role in the reconstruction of Proto-Afroasiatic consonants. Ehret justified this decision, stating that the Proto-Berber consonant inventory had diverged too significantly to be useful towards the reconstruction of Proto-Afroasiatic. However, Kaye criticized this choice, denigrating it as "circular reasoning." According to Kaye, the avoidance of Berber data naturally skewed the reconstruction of the Afroasiatic consonant system towards the language families that had been considered, thereby artificially justifying the premise that those languages were a better representation of the original Afroasiatic situation.

=== Nilo-Saharan ===
Another proposed large language phylym of Africa was tackled by Ehret in his 2001 book, A Historical-Comparative Reconstruction of Nilo-Saharan, to mixed reception. Václav Blažek, in a review article originally prepared for Afrikanische Arbeitspapiere, presents additional data, most of which, in his words, "confirm Ehret’s cognate sets.” He continues, "The weakest point in the…monograph consists in semantics. Ehret’s approach is rather benevolent …. But in any case, in the present time Ehret’s work signifies big progress.” The sociologist and linguist Gerard Philippson in his review in the Journal of African Languages and Linguistics, also raises questions on some of the semantic connections, and he has doubts about the environments of certain sound changes proposed in the book. He has issues as well with Ehret's use of evidence from the Central Sudanic branch of the Nilo-Saharan family, but he finds his arguments relating to the Eastern Sahelian (Eastern Sudanic) branch convincing and "solid.” He avers in conclusion: "Même les chercheurs s'opposant à cette reconstruction disposeront, en tous cas, d'une somme de matériaux, clairement présentés dans l'ensemble, sur lesquels ils pourront s'appuyer pour mettre en cause ou rebâtir l'ensemble proposé. Il s'agit de toutes façons d'un travail qui ne saurait être ignoré." ("Even the researchers who are opposed to this reconstruction will have, in any case, an amount of material, clearly presented throughout, which they can rely on to either challenge or rebuild what is proposed. As a whole, it constitutes a work which cannot be ignored.”) Anthropologist and linguist Roger Blench published a critical comparison of Ehret's and M. L. Bender's comparative work on the Nilo-Saharan family in Africa und Übersee in 2000—from its date, seemingly written before the book came out. It may be based, in part, on a preliminary manuscript by Ehret from the early 1990s.

== Books ==
- Ancient Africa: A Global History, to 300 CE. Princeton: Princeton University Press, 2023.
- The Civilizations of Africa: A History to 1800. Second Edition. Charlottesville: University of Virginia Press, 2016.
- A Dictionary of Sandawe: The Lexicon and Culture of a Khoesan People of Tanzania. (C. Ehret and Patricia Ehret, eds.) Köln: Rüdiger Köppe Verlag, 2012.
- History and the Testimony of Language. Berkeley, Los Angeles, London: University of California Press, 2011.
- The Civilizations of Africa: A History to 1800. Charlottesville: University Press of Virginia, 2002.
- A Historical-Comparative Reconstruction of Nilo-Saharan. Cologne: Rüdiger Köppe Verlag, 2001.
- An African Classical Age: Eastern and Southern Africa in World History, 1000 B.C. to A.D. 400. Charlottesville: University Press of Virginia, 1998.
- Reconstructing Proto-Afroasiatic (Proto-Afrasian): Vowels, Tone, Consonants, and Vocabulary. Berkeley, Los Angeles: University of California Press, 1995.
- The Archaeological and Linguistic Reconstruction of African History. (C. Ehret and M. Posnansky, eds.) Berkeley, Los Angeles: University of California Press, 1982.
- The Historical Reconstruction of Southern Cushitic Phonology and Vocabulary. Berlin: Reimer, 1980.
- Ethiopians and East Africans: The Problem of Contacts. Nairobi: East African Publishing House, 1974.
- Southern Nilotic History: Linguistic Approaches to the Study of the Past. Evanston, IL: Northwestern University Press, 1971.
