= Moscow School of Comparative Linguistics =

The Moscow School of Comparative Linguistics (also called the Nostratic School) is a school of linguistics based in Moscow, Russia that is known for its work in long-range comparative linguistics. Formerly based at Moscow State University, it is currently centered at the RSUH Institute of Linguistics (Institute of Linguistics of the Russian State University for the Humanities), and also the Institute of Linguistics of the Russian Academy of Sciences in Moscow, Russia.

== History ==
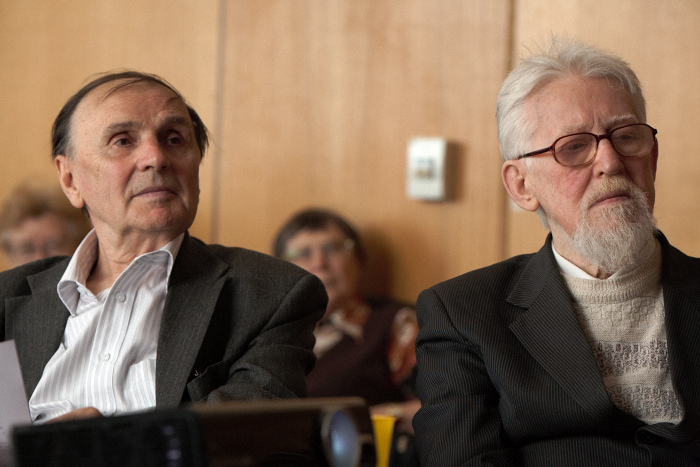
Andrey Zaliznyak (left) and Vladimir Dybo (right) at a conference dedicated to Dybo's 80th birthday, held at the Russian State University for the Humanities on May 5, 2011.

The founders of the school are Vladislav Illich-Svitych and Aharon Dolgopolsky. Vladimir Dybo, Vyacheslav Ivanov, and Andrey Zaliznyak also played key roles in the founding of the school.

In 1962, Illich-Svitych began working on a book about Nostrative comparative linguistics called A Tentative Comparison of the Nostratic Languages (Russian: Опытом сравнения ностратических языков). After the death of Illich-Svitych, his colleagues, Vladimir Dybo and Aharon Dolgopolsky, completed and published the book. Initially, Illich-Svitych and Dolgopolsky were probably doing research on Nostratic independently of each other. Both Dolgopolsky and Illich-Svitych published their first articles on Nostratic linguistics in 1964. Conferences and seminars on Nostratic comparative linguistics were organized in the 1960s. Originally, they were held informally at Vladimir Dybo's apartment, and were only formally held at the Russian State University for the Humanities since 1992.

The first generation of the school includes the Russian linguists Sergei Starostin, Sergei Nikolaev, Alexander Militarev, Ilia Peiros, Anna Dybo, Oleg Mudrak, Olga Stolbova, and Eugene Helimski. The second generation mainly consists of graduates of the Faculty of Linguistics (now the Institute of Linguistics) of the Russian State University for the Humanities from the 1990s.

During the 1960s and 1970s, the school was centered at the Department of Theoretical and Applied Linguistics of the Faculty of Philology at Moscow State University. In the 1990s, the school moved to the Faculty of Linguistics of the Russian State University for the Humanities (RSUH). Some members are also affiliated with the Institute of Linguistics of the Russian Academy of Sciences.

From the 1970s until his death in 2005, Sergei Starostin was the informal "head of the Moscow school," and since 1999, the formal head of the Center of Comparative Linguistics at the RSUH Institute for Oriental and Classical Studies.

Other linguists closely associated with the Moscow School of Comparative Linguistics include Václav Blažek, Irén Hegedűs, Murray Gell-Mann, John Bengtson, and Allan Bomhard.

== Projects ==
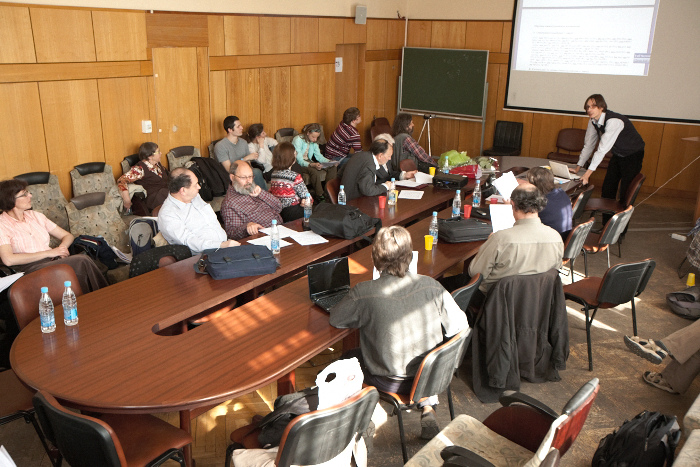
A conference dedicated to the 80th birthday of Vladimir Dybo, was held at the Russian State University for the Humanities on May 5, 2011. Clockwise from left to right, sitting at the table: V. Y. Porkhomovsky, Ilia Peiros, Olga Stolbova, Andrey Zaliznyak, Vladimir Dybo, S. G. Bolotov , Georgiy Starostin, two unknown persons, and M. A. Zhivlov.

The Tower of Babel website is the main lexical database for the Moscow School of Comparative Linguistics. The website runs on the Starling database management system and was originally developed by Sergei Starostin. After Sergei Starostin's death in 2005, the website has since been run by his son Georgiy Starostin. In 2011, the Global Lexicostatistical Database was launched.

Members of the Moscow School of Comparative Linguistics play key roles in the Evolution of Human Languages project at the Santa Fe Institute in the United States. In addition to regularly hosting the Nostratic Seminar, the school also hosts the Annual Sergei Starostin Memorial Conference on Comparative-Historical Linguistics. Academic journals include the Journal of Language Relationship.

== See also ==
- Evolution of Human Languages
