= Dybo =

Russian surname

Dybo is a Russian surname. Notable people with the surname include:

- Anna Dybo (born 1959), Russian linguist
- Vladimir Dybo (1931–2023), Russian linguist

== See also ==
- Dybo's law
- Dybo (disambiguation)
