= East Asian language group =

Proposed language family

East Asian
- (proposed, under study)
- Geographic distribution: East Asia, South Asia, Southeast Asia, Oceania, Madagascar, Siberia
- Linguistic classification: Proposed language family
- Subdivisions: Sino-Tibetan; Hmong–Mien; Kra–Dai; Austronesian; Austroasiatic; Koreanic (sometimes included); Japonic (sometimes included); Mongolic (sometimes included); Tungusic (sometimes included); Ainu (sometimes included); Paleo-Siberian; Eskaleut; Uralic (rarely included); Turkic (rarely included)

Language codes
- Glottolog: None

The East Asian languages are a conjectured language family (alternatively macrofamily or superphylum) proposed by Stanley Starosta in 2001. The proposal has since been adopted by George van Driem and Michael D. Larish. Other linguists are sceptical about this proposal.

== Classifications ==
=== Early proposals ===
Early proposals of similar linguistic macrophylla, in narrower scope:

- Austroasiatic, Austronesian, Kra–Dai, Tibeto-Burman: August Conrady (1916, 1922) and Kurt Wulff (1934, 1942)
- Austroasiatic, Austronesian, Kra–Dai, Hmong–Mien: Paul K. Benedict (1942), Robert Blust (1996), Ilia Peiros (1998)
- Austroasiatic, Austronesian, Kra–Dai, Tibeto-Burman, Hmong–Mien: Stanley Starosta (2001)

Precursors to the East Asian proposal:

- Austro-Tai (Kra–Dai and Austronesian): Gustave Schlegel (1901, 1902), Weera Ostapirat (2005)
- Austric (Austroasiatic and Austronesian): Wilhelm Schmidt (1906), Lawrence Reid (1994, 2005)

=== Starosta (2005) ===
Location of the Peiligang culture

Stanley Starosta's (2005) East Asian proposal includes a "Yangzian" branch, consisting of Austroasiatic and Hmong–Mien, to form an East Asian superphylum. However, Starosta believes his proposed Yangzian to be a direct sister of Sino-Tibetan rather than Austronesian, which is more distantly related to Sino-Tibetan as a sister of Sino-Tibetan-Yangzian. He concludes Proto-East Asian was a disyllabic (CVCVC) language spoken from 6,500 to 6,000 BCE by Peiligang culture and Cishan culture millet farmers on the North China Plain (specifically the Han River, Wei River, and central Yellow River areas).

- East Asian
  - Austronesian
    - (various Formosan branches)
    - Extra-Formosan
      - Tai–Kadai
      - Malayo-Polynesian
  - Sino-Tibetan-Yangzian
    - Sino-Tibetan
    - Yangzian
      - Austroasiatic
      - Hmong–Mien

Starosta (2005) proposes the following Proto-East Asian morphological affixes, which are found in Proto-Tibeto-Burman and Proto-Austronesian, as well as in some morphologically conservative Austroasiatic branches such as Nicobaric.

- *m(V)- 'agent of V-ing'
- *-Vn 'patient of V-ing'
- *sV- 'instrument of V-ing'
- *n(V)- 'perfective'

=== van Driem (2012) ===
The following tree of East Asian superphylum (macrofamily) was proposed by George van Driem in 2012 at the 18th Himalayan Languages Symposium, held at the Benares Hindu University.

- East Asian
  - Austro-Tai
    - Kradai
    - Austronesian
  - Austroasiatic
  - Himalayan-Yangtzean
    - Trans-Himalayan
      - Sino-Bodic
      - Burmo-Qiangic
      - Brahmaputran
      - Gongduk, etc.
      - Kiranti, etc.
    - Yangtzean
      - Hmong–Mien

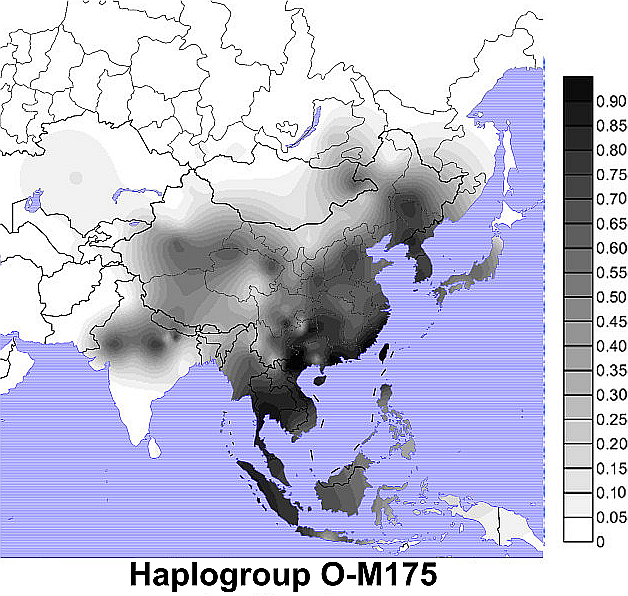
Modern distribution of basal O-M175, which expanded from southern China and Mainland Southeast Asia.

According to van Driem, the linguistic evidence for the East Asian languages matches the genetic evidence from Y-DNA Haplogroup O. (Further information: Father tongue hypothesis)

=== Larish (2006, 2017) ===
According to Michael D. Larish, the languages of Southeast and East Asia descended from one proto-language (which he calls "Proto-Asian"). Japonic is grouped together with Koreanic as one branch of the Proto-Asian family. The other branch consists of the Austronesian, Austroasiatic, Kra–Dai, Hmong–Mien and Sino-Tibetan languages.

- East Asian
  - Japano-Koreanic
    - Japonic
    - Koreanic
  - Austro-Asian
    - Austronesian
    - Austroasiatic
    - Kra–Dai
    - Hmong–Mien
    - Sino-Tibetan

== Vocabulary comparison ==
Below is a comparison of basic vocabulary items for proto-languages of all 5 East Asian language families.

Sources

- Proto-Tibeto-Burman: Matisoff (2015)
- Proto-Hmong–Mien: Ratliff (2010)
- Proto-Austroasiatic: Sidwell (2024); Sidwell & Rau (2015)
- Proto-Austronesian: Blust & Trussel (2020)
- Proto-Tai: Pittayaporn (2009)
- Proto-Hlai: Norquest (2007)
- Proto-Kra: Ostapirat (2000)

	Sino-Tibetan	Hmong–Mien	Austroasiatic	Austronesian	Kra–Dai		
gloss	Proto-Tibeto-Burman	Proto-Hmong–Mien	Proto-Austroasiatic	Proto-Austronesian	Proto-Tai	Proto-Hlai	Proto-Kra
hair	*(t)sam	*pljei	*sukˀ, *sɔkˀ	*bukeS	*prɤm^{A}	*hnom	*m-səm^{A}
eye	*s-myak	*mu̯ɛjH	*matˀ	*maCa	*p.taː^{A}	*tʃʰaː	*m-ʈa^{A}
ear	*r/g-na	*mbræu	*Ctoːr	*Caliŋa	*krwɯː^{A}	*ljəy	*k-ra^{A}
nose	*s-na ~ *s-naːr	*mbruiH	*muːh, *muːɕ	*ujuŋ	*ɗaŋ^{A}	*kʰət	*hŋət^{D}
tooth	*s/p-wa	*hmjinʔ	*muɲ, *məɲ	*lipen, *n/ŋipen	*wan^{A}	*fjən	*l-pən^{A}
tongue	*m/s-lay ~ *s-ley	*mblet	*lntaːkˀ	*Sema, *lidam	*liːn^{C}	*hliːnʔ	*l-ma^{A}
hand	*lak ~ *C-yak	*-bɔuʔ	*tiːˀ	*kamay	*mwɯː^{A}	*C-mɯː	*mja^{A}
bone	*s/m/g-rus	*tshuŋʔ	*cʔaːŋ	*CuqelaN	*C̥.duk^{D}	*Cuɾɯːk	*dək^{D}
blood	*s-hywəy-t	*ntshjamʔ	*(m)ɕaːm	*daRaq	*lɯət^{D}	*alaːc	*plat^{D}
liver	*m-sin	*-hri̯ən	*kləːm; *gre(ː)ɕ	*qaCay	*tap^{D}	*ɗəy	*təp^{D}
meat, flesh	*sya-n	P-Mienic *ʔa^{B}	*sacˀ	*Sesi	*n.mɤː^{C}	*rəmʔ	*ʔaɯ^{C}
dog	*d-kʷəy-n	P-Hmongic *hmaŋ^{C}	*cɔʔ	*asu	*ʰmaː^{A}	*hmaː	*x-ma^{A}
bird	*s-ŋak	*m-nɔk	*ciːm	*manuk	*C̬.nok^{D}	*səc	*ɳok^{D}
fish	*s-ŋya	*mbrəuʔ	*kaʔ	*Sikan	*plaː^{A}	*hlaː	*p-la^{A}
louse	*s-r(y)ik	*ntshjeiʔ	*ciʔ	*kuCux	*traw^{A}	*tʃʰwəw	*C-ʈu^{A}
leaf	*lay	P-Hmongic *mblɔŋ^{A}, P-Mienic *nɔm^{A}	*slaʔ	*waSaw	*ɓaɰ^{A}	*ɓɯː	*ɖiŋ^{A}
sun, day	*s-nəy	P-Mienic *hnu̯ɔi^{A}	*tŋiːˀ	*waRi, *qajaw	*ŋwan^{A}	*hŋwən	*(l-/h)wən^{A}
moon	*s/g-la	*hlaH	*khe(ː)ʔ	*bulaN, *qiNaS	*ɓlɯən^{A}	*C-ɲaːn	*(C-)tjan^{A}
water	*m-t(w)əy-n ~ *m-ti-s	*ʔu̯əm	*ɗaːkˀ; Pal. *ʔoːm	*daNum	*C̬.nam^{C}	*C-nəmʔ	*ʔuŋ^{C}
rain	*r/s/g-wa	P-Hmongic *m-noŋ^{C}	*gmaːˀ	*quzaN	*C̥.wɯn^{A}	*fun	*jəl^{A}
fire	*mey	*douʔ	*ʔuːɕ	*Sapuy	*wɤj^{A}	*fiː	*pui^{A}
name	*r-mi(ŋ/n)	*mpɔuH	*ɟmuh, *ɟmɨh	*ŋajan	*ɟɤː^{B}	*pʰaːŋ	*n(ʒ)i^{A}
eat	*m-dz(y)a-k/n/t/s	P-Mienic *ɲən^{C}	*ca(ː)ʔ	*kaen	*kɯɲ^{A}	*kʰən	*kan^{A}
die	*səy	*dəjH	*kceːt	*ma-aCay	*p.taːj^{A}	*hlaːwɦ	*pɣon^{A}
I	*ŋa-y ~ *ka	P-Hmongic *kɛŋ^{B}	*ʔaɲ	-ku	*kuː^{A}	*ɦuː	*ku^{A}
you (sg.)	*na-ŋ	*mu̯ei	*miːˀ, *meːˀ	-mu	*mɯŋ^{A}	*C-mɯː	*mə^{A/B}

== Commentary ==
Peter Bellwood writes that this suggestion were not adopted by most linguists. He notes that the idea is attractive, however it is probably impossible to distinguish between genetic and contact relationships due to thousands of years of intermixing and language extinctions in the area.

In a review of the 2005 book The Peopling of East Asia, K. Alexander Adelaar remarked that the hypotheses of Starosta and Van Driem lack supporting evidence although Starosta did provide some morphological evidence, which Adelaar criticized and noticed overly speculative assertions in Starosta's arguments.

== Distributions ==
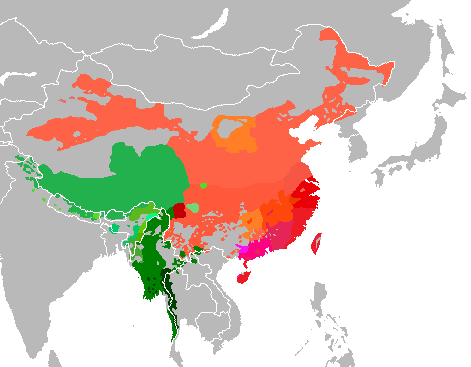
Distribution of Sino-Tibetan languages

Distribution of Kra–Dai languages

Distribution of Austroasiatic languages

Distribution of Hmong–Mien languages

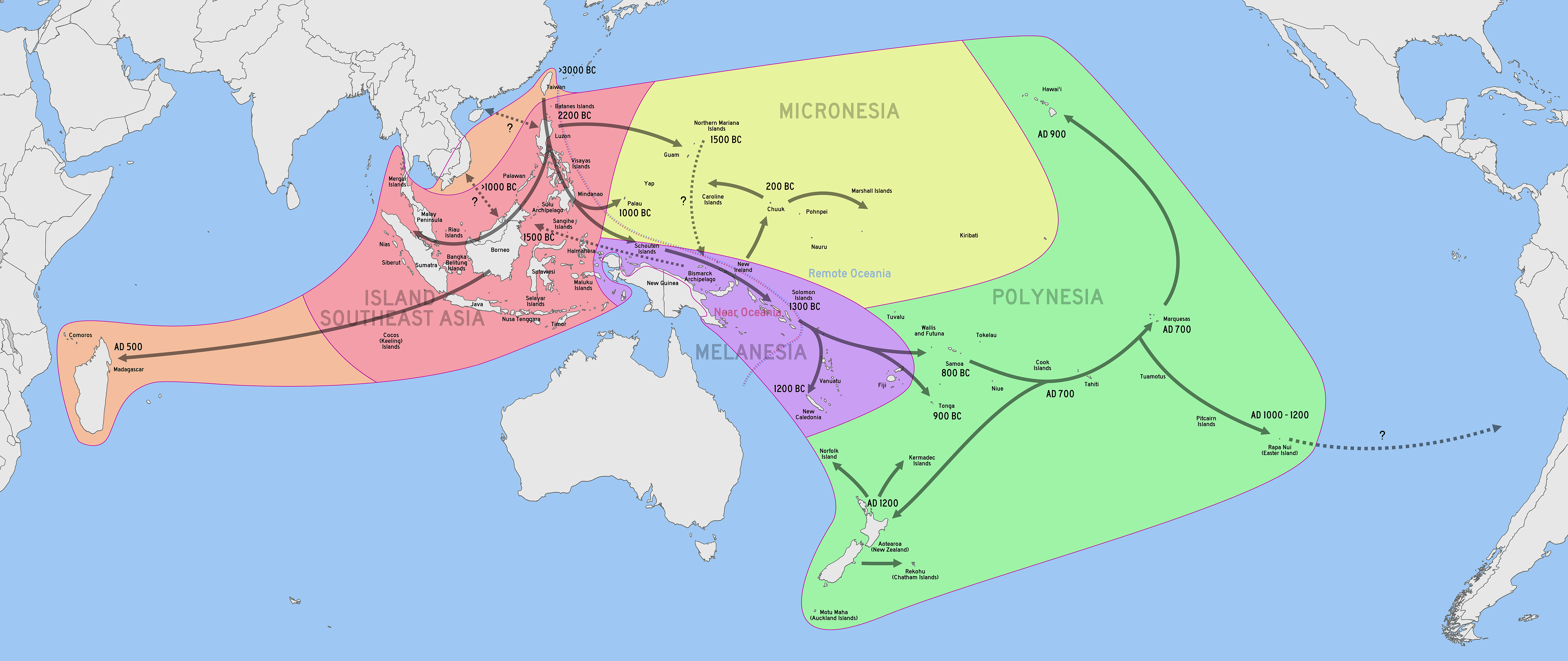
Dispersal of Austronesian languages

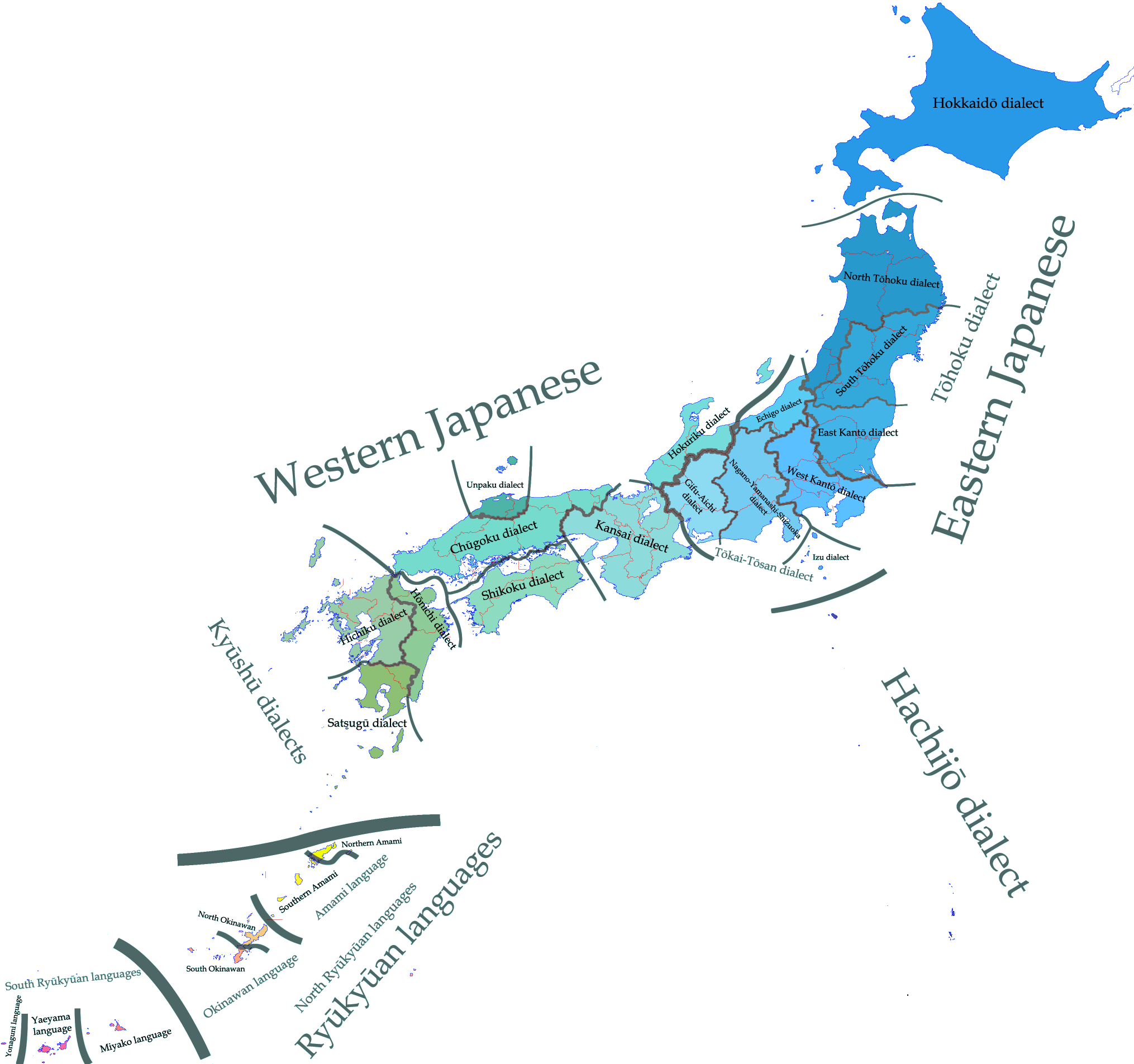
Distribution of Japonic languages

Distribution of Koreanic languages

== See also ==
- Father tongue hypothesis
- Classification of Southeast Asian languages
  - Sino-Austronesian languages
  - Austric languages
  - Austro-Tai languages
- Mainland Southeast Asia linguistic area
- Haplogroup O (Y-DNA)
- Languages of East Asia
- Languages of Southeast Asia
- Languages of China
