= Burlak (surname) =

Burlak (Russian: Бурла́к) is a Russian surname that may refer to:

- Dmitry Burlak (born 1983), Russian footballer
- Svetlana Burlak (born 1969), Russian linguist
- Taras Burlak (born 1990), Russian footballer
