= Evolution of Human Languages =

Linguistics project

The Evolution of Human Languages (EHL) project is a historical-comparative linguistics research project hosted by the Santa Fe Institute. It aims to provide a detailed genealogical classification of the world's languages.

The project was founded in 2001 by Nobel laureate Murray Gell-Mann when he partnered with Sergei Starostin and Merritt Ruhlen to map out the evolutionary tree of human languages. Initial funding was provided by the Santa Fe Institute and the MacArthur Foundation. It is currently led by Russian linguist Georgiy Starostin, the son of Sergei Starostin.

Many of the project's members belong to the Moscow School of Comparative Linguistics, including Georgiy Starostin and Ilia Peiros. Other project members include Vaclav Blazek, John D. Bengtson, Edward Vajda, and other linguists.

== Overview ==
The Evolution of Human Languages (EHL) is an international project – of which Georgiy Starostin inherited his father's membership – on "the linguistic prehistory of humanity" coordinated by the Santa Fe Institute. The project distinguishes about 6,000 languages currently spoken around the world, and aims to provide a detailed classification similar to the accepted classification of biological species.

Their idea is that "all representatives of the species Homo sapiens presumably share a common origin, [so] it would be natural to suppose – although this is a goal yet to be achieved – that all human languages also go back to some common source. Most existing classifications, however, do not go beyond some 300-400 language families that are relatively easy to discern. This restriction has natural reasons: languages must have been spoken and constantly evolving for at least 40,000 years (and quite probably more), while any two languages separated from a common source inevitably lose almost all superficially common features after some 6,000-7,000 years".

The Tower of Babel is an international etymological database project that is part of the Evolution of Human Languages project. It is coordinated by the Center of Comparative Linguistics of the Russian State University for the Humanities.

== Global Lexicostatistical Database ==
In 2011, the Global Lexicostatistical Database (GLD) was launched as part of the EHL project. The database uses the Unified Transcription System (UTS), designed specifically for the database.

=== 110-word list ===
The Global Lexicostatistical Database includes basic word lists of 110 items each for many of the world's languages. The 110-word list is a modified 100-item Swadesh list consisting of the original 100 Swadesh list items, in addition to the following 10 additional words from the Swadesh–Yakhontov list:

1. far
2. heavy
3. near
4. salt
5. short
6. snake
7. thin
8. wind
9. worm
10. year

The 110-word expanded Swadesh list by Kassian et al. (2010) is as follows.

no.	English	Russian
1	all	все
2	ashes	зола
3	bark	кора
4	belly	живот
5	big, large	большой
6	bird	птица
7	to bite	кусать
8	black	черный
9	blood	кровь
10	bone	кость
11	breast	грудь
12	to burn (trans.)	жечь, сжечь
13	cloud	облако
14	cold	холодный
15	to come	приходить
16	to die	умирать
17	dog	собака
18	to drink	пить
19	dry	сухой
20	ear	ухо
21	earth	земля
22	to eat	есть
23	egg	яйцо
24	eye	глаз
25	fat	жир
26	feather	перо
27	fire	огонь
28	fish	рыба
29	to fly	лететь, летать
30	foot	нога
31	full	полный
32	to give	давать
33	to go	идти
34	good	хороший
35	green	зеленый
36	hair	волосы
37	hand	рука
38	head	голова
39	to hear	слышать
40	heart	сердце
41	horn	рог
42a	I	я
42b	me	меня
43	to kill	убивать
44	knee	колено
45	to know	знать
46	leaf	лист
47	to lie	лежать
48	liver	печень
49	long	длинный
50	louse	вошь
51	man (male)	мужчина
52	man (person)	человек
53	many, a lot of	много
54	meat	мясо
55	moon	луна
56	mountain	гора
57	mouth	рот
58	nail	ноготь
59	name	имя
61	new	новый
62	night	ночь
63	nose	нос
64	not	не
65	one	один
66	rain	дождь
67	red	красный
68	road	дорога
69	root	корень
70a	round (3D)	круглый
70b	round (2D)	круглый
71	sand	песок
72	to say	сказать
73	to see	видеть
74	seed	семя
75	to sit	сидеть
76	skin	кожа
77	to sleep	спать
78	small, little	маленький
79	smoke	дым
80	to stand	стоять
81	star	звезда
82	stone	камень
83	sun	солнце
84	to swim	плыть, плавать
85	tail	хвост
86	that	тот
87	this	этот
88	tongue	язык
89	tooth	зуб
90	tree	дерево
91	two	два
92	warm	теплый
93	water	вода
94a	we (incl.)	мы (incl.)
94b	we (incl.)	мы (incl.)
94c–d	we (excl.)	мы (excl.)
95	what	что
96	white	белый
97	who	кто
98	woman	женщина
99	yellow	желтый
100a	you (thou)	ты
100b	you (thou)	тебя
101	far	далеко
102	heavy	тяжелый
103	near	близко
104	salt	соль
105	short	короткий
106	snake	змея
107a	thin (2D)	тонкий
107b	thin (1D)	тонкий
108	wind	ветер
109	worm	червь
110	year	год

=== 50-word list ===
A 50-word list of "ultra-stable" items for lexicostatiscal use with the database was also proposed in 2010. The 50-word list is an abridged version of the 110-word list.

no.	English	Russian
1	we	мы
2	two	два
3	I	я
4	eye	глаз
5	thou	ты
6	who	кто
7	fire	огонь
8	tongue	язык
9	stone	камень
10	name	имя
11	hand	рука
12	what	что
13	die	умирать
14	heart	сердце
15	drink	пить
16	dog	собака
17	louse (head)	вошь
18	moon	луна
19	fingernail	ноготь
20	blood	кровь
21	one	один
22	tooth	зуб
23	new	новый
24	dry (e.g. of clothes)	сухой
25	eat	есть
26	tail	хвост
27	hair (of head)	волосы
28	water	вода
29	nose	нос
30	not	не
31	mouth	рот
32	ear	ухо
33	bird	птица
34	bone	кость
35	sun	солнце
36	smoke	дым
37	tree	дерево
38	ashes	зола
39	rain	дождь
40	star	звезда
41	leaf	лист
42	kill	убивать
43	foot	нога
44	horn	рог
45	hear	слышать
46	meat (as food)	мясо
47	egg	яйцо
48	black	черный
49	head	голова
50	night	ночь

== See also ==
- Moscow School of Comparative Linguistics
- Cross-Linguistic Linked Data
- Genographic Project
