= Stanley Starosta =

American linguist (1939–2002)

- Born: November 28, 1939; Oconomowoc, Wisconsin, US
- Died: July 18, 2002 (aged 62); Honolulu, Hawaii, US
- Occupation: Linguist
- Title: Professor of Linguistics

Academic background
- Education: University of Wisconsin

Academic work
- Discipline: Linguistics
- Sub-discipline: Morphology, historical linguistics
- Institutions: University of Hawaiʻi
- Main interests: Austronesian languages, languages of South Asia, dependency grammar
- Notable works: The case for Lexicase (1988)
- Notable ideas: Lexicase, East Asian languages hypothesis

Chinese name
- Traditional Chinese: 帥德樂
- Simplified Chinese: 帅德乐
Transcriptions
Standard Mandarin
- Hanyu Pinyin: Shuai Dele
- Wade–Giles: Shuai4 Te2-le4

Stanley Starosta (born November 28, 1939, Oconomowoc, Wisconsin; died July 18, 2002, Honolulu, Hawaii), also known as Stan Starosta, was an American linguist. He is known for proposing Lexicase theory and the East Asian languages macrophylum hypothesis.

== Early life and education ==
Starosta was born on November 28, 1939, in Oconomowoc, Wisconsin. He graduated from Oconomowoc High School in 1957. Starosta obtained his B.A. in physics in 1961 and Ph.D. in linguistics in 1967, both from the University of Wisconsin.

== Career ==
Starosta was assistant professor of linguistics at the University of Hawaiʻi at Mānoa from 1967 to 1971, and was associate professor of linguistics from 1971 to 1975. Since then, he held the title of Professor of Linguistics at the same university.

In 1988, he published a book, The case for Lexicase, in which he presents a type of dependency grammar that he had developed since the early 1970s.

Starosta also proposed an East Asian linguistic macrophylum. A paper on his East Asian proposal was published posthumously in 2005.

Starosta's primary interests included the morphosyntax of Austronesian languages (particularly the Formosan and Philippine languages) and various languages of South Asia (such as Gujarati), and historical linguistics.

== Death ==
On July 18, 2002, Starosta died of congestive heart failure in Honolulu, Hawaii.

== Selected publications ==
- 1969. Review of Tung T'ung-ho, A descriptive study of the Tsou language, Formosa. Language 45:439–444.
- 1971. Review of John Lyons, Introduction to theoretical linguistics. Language 47:429–447.
- 1982. The evolution of focus in Austronesian. In Papers from the Third International Conference on Austronesian Linguistics, vol. 2: Tracking the travelers, ed. by Stephen A. Wurm and Lois Carrington, 145–170. Series C-75. Canberra: Pacific Linguistics. (co-authored with Andrew K. Pawley and Lawrence A. Reid)
- 1988. The case for lexicase: An outline of lexicase grammatical theory. Open Linguistics Series, ed. by Robin Fawcett. London: Pinter Publishers.
- 1994. A grammatical subgrouping of Formosan languages. In Austronesian studies relating to Taiwan, ed. by Paul J.-K. Li, Cheng-hwa Tsang, Ying-kuei Huang, Dah-an Ho, and Chiu-yu Tseng, 683–726. Symposium series of the Institute of History and Philology no. 3. Taipei: Academia Sinica.
- 1997. Sora noun inflection. In Languages of tribal and indigenous peoples of India: The ethnic space, ed. by Anvita Abbi, 263–306. MLBD Series in Linguistics 10. Delhi: Motilal Banarsidass Publishers.
- 1999. How can syntactic change diffuse through the lexicon?: The case of Cantonese comparative constructions. In Selected papers from the Fifth Annual International Conference on Chinese Linguistics (ICCL-5), ed. by H. Samuel Wang, Feng-fu Tsao, and Chin-fa Lien, 253–278. Taipei: Crane Publishing. (co-authored with Cathy Sin Ping Wong)
- 2000. The prehistory and pre-prehistory of the Austronesian languages: A linguistic perspective. Newsletter, Institute for the Study of Languages and Cultures of Asia and Africa 99:61–64. Tokyo: Tokyo University of Foreign Studies.
- 2001a. Dependency grammar and monostratal transfer. In Language matters: In honour of Professor C. Ramarao, ed. by B. Vijayanarayana, K. Nagamma Reddy, and Aditi Mukherjee, 127–154. Hyderabad: Centre for Advanced Study in Linguistics, Osmania University, and Booklinks Corporation.
- 2001b. Ergativity in Gujarati, Hindi, and Pashto: The evidence from causative constructions. In Tokyo Symposium on South Asian Languages: Contact, convergence, and typology, ed. by Peri Bhaskararao and Karumuri Venkata Subbarao, 411–456. The Yearbook of South Asian Languages and Linguistics 2001. New Delhi: Sage Publications.
- 2001c. Gujarati morphological causatives: A word-and-paradigm analysis. In Linguistic structure and language dynamics in South Asia: Papers from the proceedings of the Eighteenth South Asian Languages Analysis Roundtable (SALA 18), ed. by Anvita Abbi, R. S. Gupta, and Ayesha Kidwai. MLBD Series in Linguistics vol. 15. Delhi: Motilal Banarsidass Publishers.
- 2001d. The identification of word classes in Thai. In Essays in Tai linguistics, ed. by M. R. Kalaya Tingsabadh and Arthur Abramson, 63–90. Bangkok: Chulalongkorn University Press.
- 2002. Austronesian 'focus' as derivation: Evidence from nominalization. In Language and Linguistics 3(2):427–479. Taipei: Academia Sinica.
