= Etymological Dictionary of the Altaic Languages =

Dictionary of the hypothetical Altaic language family

- Author: Sergei Starostin, Anna Dybo, Oleg Mudrak, with assistance of Ilya Gruntov and Vladimir Glumov
- Published: 2003, Leiden
- ISBN: 9004131531

The Etymological Dictionary of the Altaic Languages is a comparative and etymological dictionary based on the Altaic language family hypothesis. It was written by linguists Sergei Starostin, Anna Dybo, and Oleg Mudrak, and was published in Leiden in 2003 by Brill Publishers. It contains 3 volumes, and is a part of the Handbook of Oriental Studies [in German: Handbuch der Orientalistik, HdO]: Section 8, Uralic and Central Asian Studies; no. 8.

The work was sponsored by the Soros Foundation, the Russian Foundation for Basic Research, and the Russian Foundation for Humanities. The work was also supported by Ariel Investments in the Tower of Babel project. All work was conducted within Starostin's STARLING database, available online.

== Contents ==
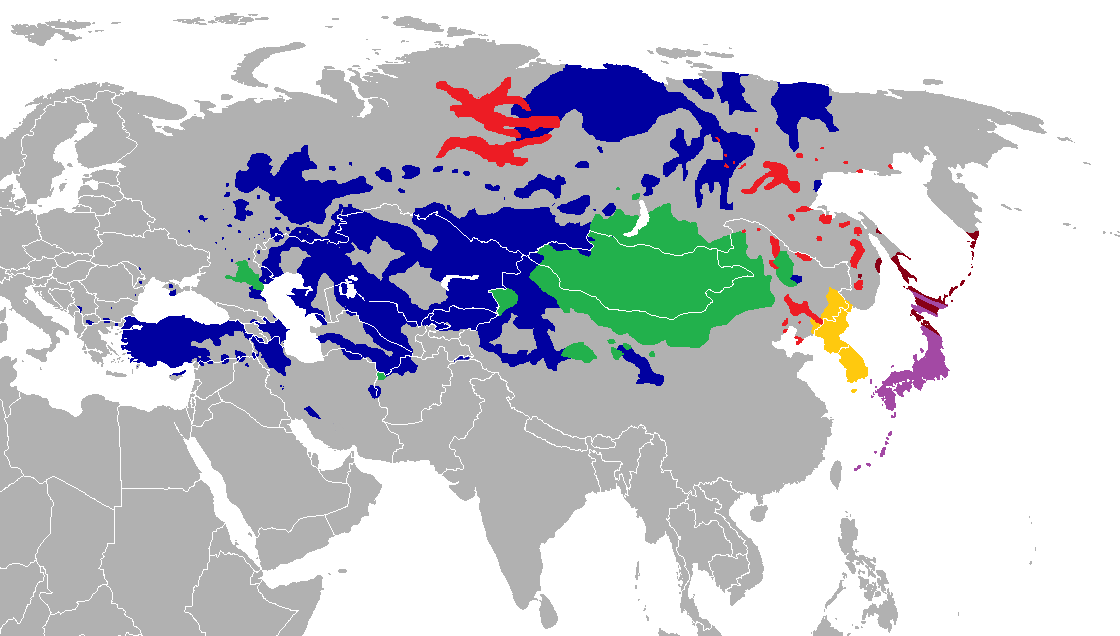
A map of the proposed Altaic language family

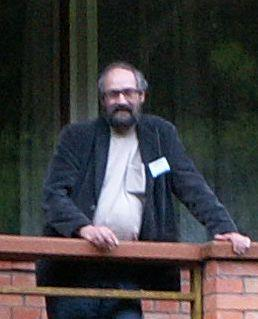
Sergei Starostin

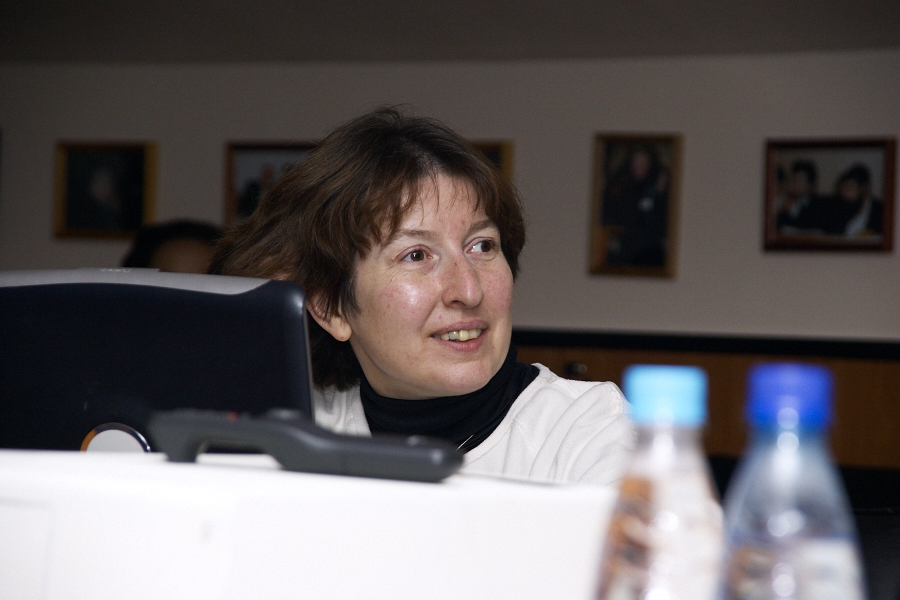
Anna Dybo

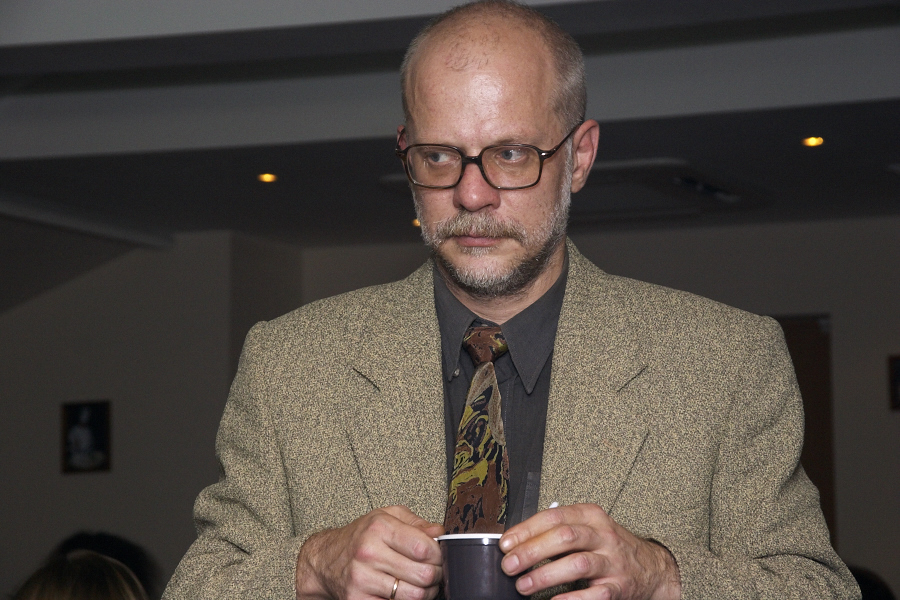
Oleg Mudrak

The Etymological Dictionary of the Altaic Languages contains 2,800 etymologies, among which half were newly developed by the team over 10 years. There is an introduction at the beginning detailing the authors' defenses of the Altaic language family theory. It is claimed that there are two contact zones for the Altaic languages. The first, the Turko-Mongolian Contact, led to many Turkic and Mongolic words being used in both Turkic and Mongolic languages. The authors attempt to explain Turko-Mongolian shared words through loanwords from the 13th century as well as Turkic and Mongolic languages having a common ancestor. The example given is the comparison between Proto-Turkic aŕiga and Middle Mongol ara'a and aral. It is then claimed that the explanation for words with the root ara- being borrowed into Mongolic from Turkic is unsatisfactory, and that the words came from the common Altaic root aŕi, with the suffix -ga. The authors do the same with the Mongol-Tungus Contact, which they also believe the loanword explanation to be insufficient for.

The second chapter of the introduction is a comparative phonology of the Altaic language family. The linguists say that the most common Altaic root structure is CVCV, and compared it with Japanese. They also reconstructed a consonant system for Altaic, and talk about the Khalaj h-, which yields h- in Khalaj but 0- in other Turkic languages.

The dictionary views Altaic as extending to the 5th millennium B.C., and consisting of 3 groups – Turko-Mongolic, Mongol-Tungusic, and Korean-Japanese, using lexostatistical evidence to justify it. The inclusion of Korean and Japanese into the Altaic language family differs from the comparative works of earlier Altaicists. The dictionary makes distinctions between inherited words and interlingual borrowings.

== Reception ==
The Etymological Dictionary of the Altaic Languages, although aimed at providing further proof for the existence of the Altaic language family, received criticism from other linguists. It has been criticized for missing small details and requirements in its comparisons, and that the dictionary would have to need more evaluation by Stefan Georg, which Starostin responded to. Roy Andrew Miller, an Altaicist, praised it, saying that the "publication can only be welcomed, not only by comparative and historical linguists but by everyone interested in the early history and cultures of Greater Asia. The thousands of pages in these three volumes make available important scholarship by our Russian colleagues, much of which until recently lurked in the decent obscurity of Soviet books and periodicals always difficult if not impossible to obtain in the West..."
