= Sergei Starostin =

Russian linguist (1953–2005)

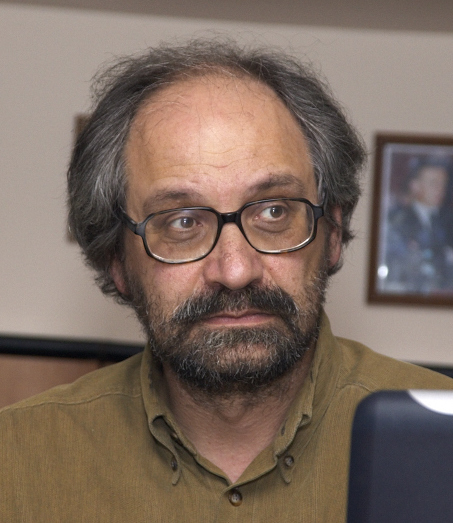
- Starostin in 2004
- Born: Sergei Anatolyevich Starostin; March 24, 1953; Moscow, Soviet Union
- Died: September 30, 2005 (aged 52); Moscow, Russia
- Children: Georgiy Starostin

Academic background
- Influences: Aharon Dolgopolsky, Vladislav Illich-Svitych, Andrey Zaliznyak, Vladimir Dybo, Sergei Yakhontov

Academic work
- School or tradition: Moscow school, historical linguistics
- Main interests: Long-range language reconstruction (especially Nostratic and Dené–Caucasian), glottochronology, accentology (especially Indo-European)
- Notable ideas: Dené–Caucasian hypothesis, reconstruction of Proto-Altaic, Proto-North-Caucasian, Proto-Yeniseian, Proto-Tibeto-Burman, Proto-Kiranti, reconstruction of Old Chinese and Proto-Japanese, advancement of "recalibrated glottochronology"
- Influenced: Merritt Ruhlen, John Bengtson

Sergei Anatolyevich Starostin (Russian: Серге́й Анато́льевич Ста́ростин; March 24, 1953 – September 30, 2005) was a Russian historical linguist and philologist, perhaps best known for his reconstructions of hypothetical proto-languages, including his work on the controversial Altaic theory, the formulation of the Dené–Caucasian hypothesis, and the proposal of a Borean language family of still earlier date. None of his proposed macrofamilies have seen wide-scale acceptance in the linguistic community and are mostly seen as implausible.

== Theories ==
In 1986, Starostin and Igor M. Diakonoff suggested that the Hurro-Urartian languages belong to the Northeast Caucasian language family. Starostin also helped with reconstructions Proto-Kiranti, Proto-Tibeto-Burman, Proto-Yeniseian, Proto-North-Caucasian, and Proto-Altaic. He also expanded the hypothesis that Japanese is related to the Turkic and Mongolic languages through an "Altaic" family.

The Dené–Caucasian hypothesis proposes that Northwest Caucasian, Northeast Caucasian, Yeniseian, Sino-Tibetan, and Na-Dené form a single, higher-order language family. According to Starostin, the Dené–Caucasian as well as two other proposed macrofamilies, Austric and Nostratic, can further be linked at an earlier stage, which Starostin called the Borean (i.e. 'Northern') languages.

== Evolution of Human Languages project ==
Since 1985, Starostin had been developing STARLING, a database management system designed for his Tower of Babel website. He was assisted in his work by Murray Gell-Mann. At the time of his death, he was a professor at the Russian State University for the Humanities, a visiting professor at the Santa Fe Institute, and a frequent guest lecturer at Leiden University in the Netherlands, where he was awarded the degree of doctor honoris causa in June 2005.

== Personal life and death ==
Starostin died of a heart attack on September 30, 2005, in Moscow after a lecture at the Russian State University for the Humanities. His son, Georgiy Starostin, is also a linguist.

== Selected works ==
- 1986. Co-authored with Igor M. Diakonoff. Hurro-Urartian as an Eastern Caucasian Language. Munich: R. Kitzinger.
- 1989. Реконструкция древнекитайской фонологической системы [Reconstruction of Old Chinese Phonological System]. Moscow: Nauka.
- 1991. Алтайская проблема и происхождение японского языка [The Altaic Problem and the Origin of the Japanese Language]. Moscow: Nauka.
- 1994. Co-authored with Sergei Nikolaev. A North Caucasian Etymological Dictionary. Moscow: Asterisk Publishers.
- 1995. "The historical position of Bai". Московский лингвистический журнал 1, 174-190. Moscow.
- 2003. Co-authored with Anna V. Dybo and Oleg A. Mudrak. Etymological Dictionary of the Altaic Languages, 3 volumes. Leiden: Brill. ISBN 9004131531.
- 2005. Co-authored with Svetlana Burlak. Сравнительно-историческое языкознание [Comparative-Historical Linguistics]. Moscow: Academia. ISBN 5-7695-1445-0.

== See also ==
- Moscow School of Comparative Linguistics
