= Lexicase =

Type of dependency grammar

Lexicase is a type of dependency grammar originally developed beginning in the early 1970s by Stanley Starosta at the University of Hawaii. Dozens of Starosta's graduate students also contributed to the theory and wrote at least 20 doctoral dissertations using Lexicase to analyze numerous languages of Asia (Japanese, Mandarin, Vietnamese, Thai, Khmer, Tagalog, etc.), Europe (Greek, Russian, etc.), and Africa (Swahili and Yoruba).

Lexicase is a monostratal X-bar grammar (i.e. it is not a transformational grammar) in which words are the heads of their own phrases (i.e. there are no assumed empty phrases). In Lexicase, words have features that determine the morphosyntactic distribution of their dependents. A primary goal of Lexicase is to provide a simple, transparent, disprovable means of testing cross-linguistic tendencies.

As a lexically focused theory, Lexicase has been used to identify verb subcategories in Korean, Russian, Thai, and Vietnamese, and noun subcategories in Khmer and Thai and to provide an overall language description of Pacoh in central Vietnam. Regarding arguments and clause structure, it has been used to explore case in Greek and Mandarin Chinese and transitivity and ergativity in Amis, an indigenous language in Taiwan and in Proto-Central Pacific Austronesian, among other topics.

== Bibliography ==
- Alves, Mark J. (2000). A Pacoh analytic grammar. Ph.D. dissertation. Honolulu: University of Hawai'i.
- Bender, Byron W. (2002). In Memoriam, Stanley Starosta 1939-2002. Oceanic Linguistics Volume 41, Number 2, December 2002. 255-274.
- Clark, Marybeth. (1978). Coverbs and case in Vietnamese. Pacific Linguistics, The Australian National University.
- Indrambarya, Kitima. (1994). Subcategorization of Verbs in Thai. Ph.D. dissertation. Honolulu: University of Hawai'i.
- Jeong, Hy-Sook Rhee. (1992). A valency subcategorization of verbs in Korean and Russian: a Lexicase dependency approach. Ph.D. dissertation. Honolulu: University of Hawai'i.
- Kikusawa, Ritsuko. (2000). Reconstructing the actancy systems of Proto-Central Pacific and its daughter languages: ergativity, accusativity and their diachronic development. Ph.D. dissertation. Honolulu: University of Hawai'i.
- Liao, Hsiu-chuan. (2004). Transitivity and ergativity in Formosan and Philippine languages. Ph.D. dissertation. Honolulu: University of Hawai'i.
- Sak-Humphrey, Channy. (1996). Khmer nouns and noun phrases: a dependency grammar analysis. Ph.D. dissertation. Honolulu: University of Hawai'i.
- Savetamalya, Saranya. (1989). Thai nouns and noun phrases: a Lexicase analysis. Ph.D. dissertation. Honolulu: University of Hawai'i.
- Starosta, Stanley. (1985). Mandarin case marking: a localistic Lexicase Analysis. In Journal of Chinese Linguistics, 13, 215-266.
- Starosta, Stanley. (1988). The case for Lexicase: An outline of Lexicase grammatical theory. Open Linguistics Series, ed. by Robin Fawcett. London: Pinter Publishers.
- Starosta, Stanley. (2001). Dependency grammar and monostratal transfer. In Language matters: In honour of Professor C. Ramarao, ed. by B. Vijayanarayana, K. Nagamma Reddy, and Aditi Mukherjee, 127–154. Hyderabad: Centre for Advanced Study in Linguistics, Osmania University, and Booklinks Corporation.
- Starosta, Stanley. (2006). Lexicase revisited. Encyclopedia of languages and linguistics. Pergamon Press.
- Starosta, Stanley. (2008). Dependency grammar and lexicalism. In An international handbook of contemporary research, ed. by Vilmos Ágel, Ludwig M. Eichinger, Hans-Werner Eroms, Peter Hellwig, Hans Jürgen Heringer, and Hening Lobin. Berlin and New York: Walter de Gruyter.
- Trask, R. L. 1993. A Dictionary of Grammatical Terms in Linguistics. London: Routledge.
- Wilawan, Supriya. (1993). A reanalysis of so-called serial verb constructions in Thai, Khmer, Mandarin Chinese, and Yoruba. Ph.D. dissertation. Honolulu: University of Hawai'i.
