= Dybo (disambiguation) =

Dybo or DYBO may refer to:

- Dybo (surname)
- Emperor Dybo, a fictional character from the Quintaglio Ascension Trilogy
- DYBO, the callsign of a station owned by Brigada Mass Media Corporation
