= Vladimir Oryol =

Russian linguist and etymologist

Vladimir Oryol Владимир Орёл
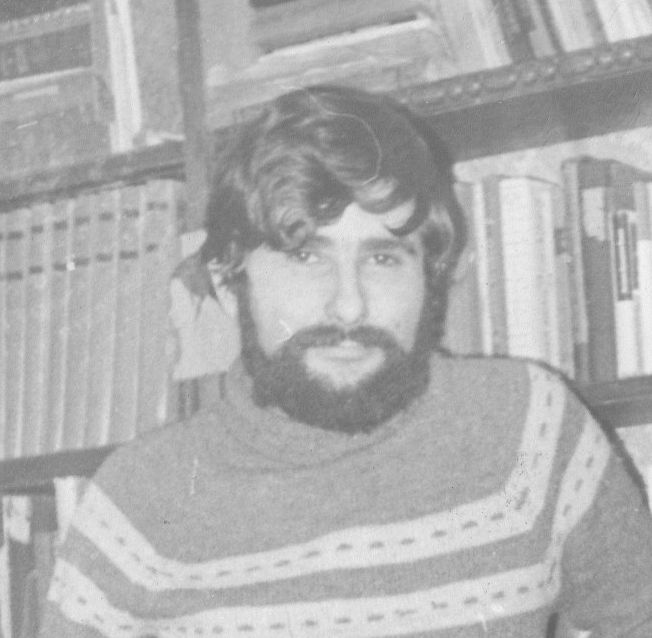
- Oryol in Moscow, 1980
- Born: Vladimir Emmanuilovich Oryol; 9 February 1952
- Died: 5 August 2007 (aged 55)
- Education: Moscow State University
- Known for: being a leading authority on the Albanian language
- Scientific career
- Fields: historical linguistics, Albanology, etymology

Vladimir Emmanuilovich Oryol (Russian: Владимир Эммануилович Орëл; 9 February 1952 – 5 August 2007) was a Russian linguist, professor, and etymologist.

== Biography ==
At the Moscow State University he studied theoretical linguistics (1971) and structural linguistics (1973). He defended his Ph.D. thesis in 1981, Sostav i charakteristika balkanoslavjanskich jazykov, a comparative analysis of Slavic languages in the Balkans. From then until 1990, he worked at the Institute of Slavic and Balkan Studies in Moscow, where he completed his second doctoral thesis in 1989 (Sravniteľno-istoričeskaja grammatika albanskogo jazyka: fonetika i morfologija), on the historical grammar of Albanian.

Between 1989 and 1990, he also taught historical linguistics at Moscow State University. After his emigration to Israel, he continued to teach at the Hebrew University of Jerusalem between 1991 and 1992. Later, he relocated to Tel Aviv University, where he taught in the Department of Classical Studies between 1992 and 1997, focusing on comparative linguistics, mythology and folklore, history, and philosophy. In 1994, he worked at the Shalom Hartman Institute in Jerusalem where he dedicated himself to biblical studies, and the following two years acting as a visiting scholar at Wolfson College, Oxford. The last two years in Israel (1997–99) he spent at Bar-Ilan University.

Afterward, he went to Calgary in Canada, where he started to work at Zi Corporation as a director of research and language teaching between 2001 and 2002. After brief activity at the Princeton University in New Jersey (2001–02), where he worked in the department of testing services, he started to work at the universities in Alberta, Canada, specifically Athabasca University (since 2003), Mount Royal College (since 2003), University of Calgary (since 2004), University of Lethbridge (2004–05). There, he lectured on comparative linguistics, biblical studies, as well as on business English, English literature, and creative writing, among other topics. From 2005 until his death, he ran the Translation Center at the Calgary Regional Health Authority.

== Work ==
He worked three decades as a professional research linguist. Oryol's work encompassed extraordinary variety of interests: from Slavic via modern Balkan languages to Paleo-Balkan languages (most notably Phrygian), from Proto-Indo-European roots and its Nostratic context on the one hand, to the analysis of Biblical Hebrew and Old Testament texts and Proto-Afroasiatic language on the other hand.

He has left behind about 200 articles and over two dozen reviews. Above all, however, are 6 monographs, four of which are etymological dictionaries (with the unassuming titles such as Handbook of Germanic Etymology actually hiding a full etymological dictionary). Finally, the third part of his Russian etymological dictionary (which was already termed as "new Vasmer") was unfinished due to his death.

His Albanian Etymological Dictionary (1998) is a useful overview of existing etymologies, and it well complements his A Concise Historical Grammar of Albanian (2000).

The monograph Phrygian Language (1997) summarizes the old/neo-Phrygian epigraphy, interpretation of all the known inscriptions until the 1990s and the corresponding grammatical comments.

Oryol also dealt with the Indo-European languages, especially the Balto-Slavic, Germanic, Albanian, and Celtic branches. He also took interest in Semitic languages, Hebrew in the first place, and more broadly in Afroasiatic languages as a whole, where lie his most controversial results. Through collaboration with Olga Stolbova he published the Hamito-Semitic Etymological Dictionary (1995) which on one hand brought a number of new sub-lexical comparisons, especially Semitic-Chadic. On the other hand, the value of the benefits of reduced transcriptions used and inaccurate translations, absence of primary sources for non-written languages, and especially countless pseudo-reconstructions formulated ad hoc often on two or even a single word were seriously frowned upon by specialists, who also pointed out other serious errors in the work (especially in Cushitic material, as well as not neglecting the massive number of Arabic loanwords in Berber languages).

He published the following monographs:

- together with Olga Stolbova, Hamito-Semitic Etymological Dictionary. Leiden: Brill, 1995 (578 pp.)
- The Language of Phrygians. Ann Arbor: Caravan Books, 1997 (501 pp.)
- Albanian Etymological Dictionary. Leiden: Brill, 1998 (670 pp.)
- A Concise Historical Grammar of Albanian. Leiden: Brill, 2000 (350 pp.)
- Handbook of Germanic Etymology. Leiden: Brill, 2003 (700 pp.)
- Russian Etymological Dictionary. Vol. 1: A–J. Ed. Vitaly Shevoroshkin. Calgary: Octavia, 2007 (408 pp.)
- Russian Etymological Dictionary. Vol. 2: K–O. Ed. Vitaly Shevoroshkin. Calgary: Octavia, 2007 (395 pp.)
- Russian Etymological Dictionary. Vol. 3: P–S. Ed. Vitaly Shevoroshkin. Calgary: Octavia, 2008 (327 pp.)
- Russian Etymological Dictionary. Vol. 4: T–Ja. Ed. Cindy Drover-Davidson. Calgary: Theophania Publishing, 2011 (298 pp.)
