= Svetlana Burlak =

Russian linguist

- Born: 12 June 1969 (age 56)
- Scientific career
- Fields: Linguistics, historical linguistics
- Institutions: Moscow State University

Svetlana Anatolyevna Burlak (Russian: Светлана Анатольевна Бурлак; born 12 June 1969) is a Russian linguist, an Indo-European languages scholar, as well as an author of works on comparative linguistics and on the genesis of human language.

== Biography ==
Burlak graduated from the Department of Theoretical and Applied Linguistics of the faculty of philology at Lomonosov Moscow State University in 1991, and obtained her PhD in 1995. Her major works include articles and books on comparative linguistics and on Tocharistics, and research on the genesis of human language. Since 1996 she has given lectures at MSU on comparative linguistics. Burlak has authored approximately 20 articles and books, including Historical phonology of the Tocharian languages and the manual Comparative linguistics (jointly with Sergei Starostin).

She is a senior researcher at the Institute of Oriental Studies of the Russian Academy of Sciences and a Tocharist. Burlak has composed many linguistic problems, and has also written several manuals and popular science publications. She is one of the permanent professors of the summer linguistic school and summer ecological school. Burlak is Professor of the Russian Academy of Sciences.

Burlak participated regularly in the Russian intellectual quiz show, What? Where? When? from 1995 to 2006 as a part of Ilya Itkin's team.
