= Lawrence A. Reid =

American linguist

- Born: Lawrence Andrew Reid
- Occupation: Linguist

Academic background
- Education: University of Hawaiʻi

Academic work
- Institutions: University of Hawaiʻi
- Main interests: Austronesian linguistics

Lawrence Andrew Reid (often known as Laurie Reid) is an American linguist who specializes in Austronesian languages, particularly on the morphosyntax and historical linguistics of the Philippine languages.

== Education ==
Reid graduated from the University of Hawaiʻi with a Master of Arts in Linguistics in 1964 and a doctorate in 1966. He also studied music at the University of Canterbury in Christchurch, New Zealand, and theology at Commonwealth Bible College in Brisbane, Australia.

== Career ==
Reid was a long-time lecturer at the University of Hawaiʻi. He has held research and teaching positions in institutions throughout the Pacific region, including at the University of Auckland, Australian National University, Thammasat University, and ILCAA (Research Institute for Languages and Cultures of Asia and Africa) at the Tokyo University of Foreign Studies.

He also written many papers on Formosan languages.

== Publications ==
Reid has published numerous books, articles, reviews, and translations. His books include An Ivatan Syntax; Central Bontoc: Sentence, Paragraph and Discourse Structures; Philippine Minor Languages: Word Lists and Phonologies; Bontok-English Dictionary; and Guinaang Bontok Texts.

- An Ivatan syntax (1966)
- Central Bontoc: Sentence, paragraph and discourse (1970)
- Philippine Minor Languages (1971)
- Bontok-English dictionary, with English-Bontok finder list (1976)
- Philippine linguistics: The State of the art: 1970–1980 (1981)
- The demise of Proto-Philippines (1982)
- Guinaang Bontok texts (1992)
- Morphological evidence for Austric (1994)
- Guide to Isinay Orthography (2016)
