= Anna Dybo =

Russian linguist (born 1959)

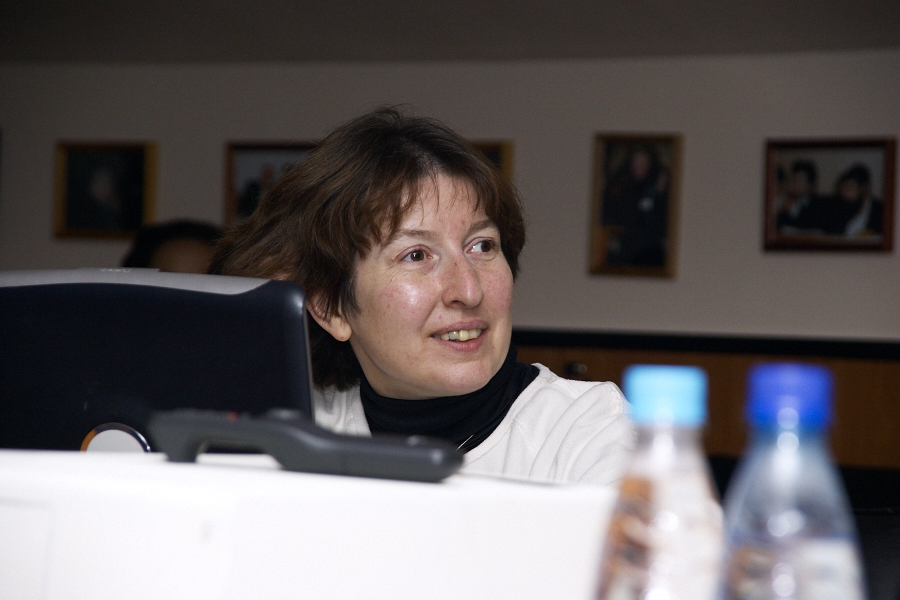
Anna Dybo in 2004

Anna Vladimirovna Dybo (Russian: Анна Владимировна Дыбо, born June 4, 1959) is a Russian linguist who specializes in the Altaic languages.

Dybo is an active defender of the existence of the Altaic language family, despite the objections of many other linguists, especially those outside Russia. She is co-author (with Sergei Starostin) of the Etymological Dictionary of the Altaic Languages (2003), which encompasses some 3,000 Proto-Altaic stems.

Anna is the daughter of Vladimir Dybo and has three children. She was elected a corresponding member of the Russian Academy of Sciences in 2008.

== Dybo's views on the dissemination of Turkic peoples ==
Dybo locates the original homeland of the Turks in the Ordos Plateau, along the banks of the Yellow River, at the turn of the eras. Dybo opposes placing their homeland in Siberia, arguing that during the relevant period there were no species of animals or plants (such as oak and linden) whose names can be reconstructed for Proto-Turkic. She views the Proto-Turks as a sedentary population practicing transhumance. The nomadic way of life was adopted later from the speakers of Iranian languages.

Dybo regards the Xiongnu as the first Turkic people mentioned in historical sources: the Xiongnu vocabulary list recorded by Sima Qian can be clearly interpreted through Proto-Turkic reconstructions, although it also contains minor Scytho-Sarmatian elements and one Mongolic loanword. According to Dybo, the Xiongnu were the first (even before, or simultaneously with, the Bulgars) to separate from the rest of the Turks and migrate to Europe. She considers the Huns to be more or less identical with the Xiongnu. Dybo rejects attempts to classify the Hunnic language within any linguistic family based on personal names, since such names are highly susceptible to borrowing.

With the start of the Turkic invasions, the nomadic speakers of the Iranian languages (former Sarmatians, Alans, etc.) adopted the newcomers’ agglutinative languages, which were easier to learn, and thus became Turkicized. The anthropological diversity of the Turks is also explained by the fact that those conquests were typically carried out by cavalry, and the conquerors found their wives among the subjugated populations.

After the Bulgars, the ancestors of the Yakuts were the next to separate from the Turkic core. They lived for many centuries somewhere around Lake Baikal, undergoing several strong waves of Mongolic influence. They did not move into their present territory until the 16th century. The lateness of Tungusic borrowings in the Yakut language—which do not affect the basic vocabulary—indicates that there were no early contacts with Tungusic languages.

== Selected works ==
- 2003. With Sergei A. Starostin and Oleg A. Mudrak. Etymological Dictionary of the Altaic Languages, 3 volumes. Leiden: Brill Academic Publishers. ISBN 90-04-13153-1
- 2005. "Dental explosives in Proto-Turkic" (in Russian). Aspects of Comparative Linguistics 1 (2005), 49–82. Moscow: RSUH Publishers.
- 2007. "Reconstruction of Proto-Oguz Conjugation" (in Russian). Aspects of Comparative Linguistics 2 (2007), 259–280. Moscow: RSUH Publishers.
- 2008. With George S. Starostin. "In defense of the comparative method, or the end of the Vovin controversy." (Originally published in: Aspects of Comparative Linguistics 3 (2008), 109-258 (in Russian), Moscow: RSUH Publishers.)
