= Olga Stolbova =

Soviet and Russian linguist

Olga Valerevna Stolbova
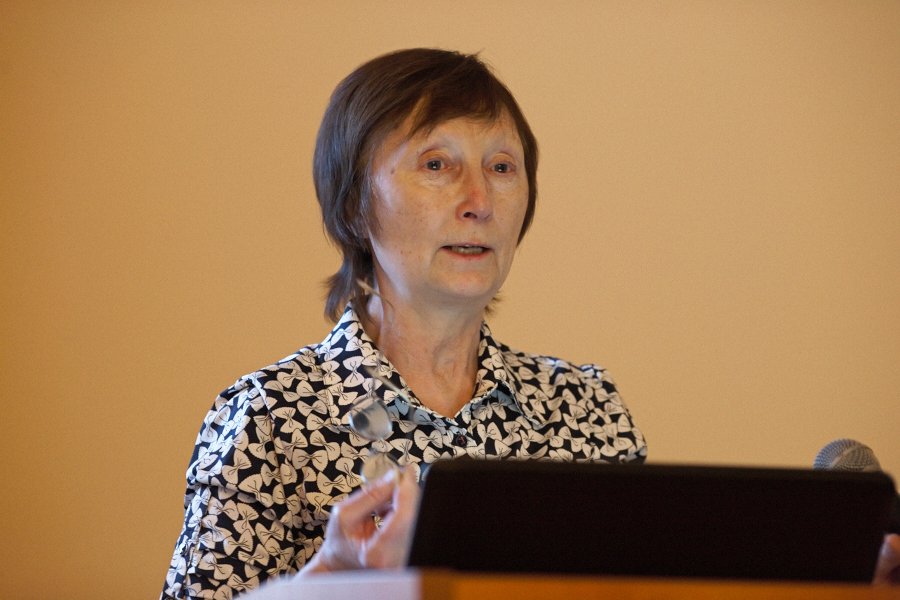
- Stolbova in 2015
- Born: April 6, 1947 (age 79)

Academic background
- Education: Moscow State University

Academic work
- Discipline: Linguistics
- Sub-discipline: Chadic languages, comparative linguistics
- Institutions: Moscow State Linguistic University, Institute of Linguistics of the Russian Academy of Sciences, Institute of Oriental Studies of the Russian Academy of Sciences

Olga Valerevna Stolbova (Russian - О́льга Вале́рьевна Столбо́ва) (born 6 April 1947) is a Russian and Soviet linguist, known for her work on the Chadic languages. She received her Doctor of Sciences in 1998. Stolbova is a senior research fellow at the Institute of Oriental Studies of the Russian Academy of Sciences and a representative of the Moscow School of Comparative Linguistics.
