= Austric languages =

Hypothetical parent family of the Austroasiatic and Austronesian languages

Austric
- (proposed)
- Geographic distribution: Southeast Asia, Pacific Islands, South Asia, East Asia, Madagascar
- Linguistic classification: Proposed language family
- Subdivisions: Austroasiatic; Austronesian; Kra–Dai – sometimes included; Hmong–Mien – sometimes included

Language codes
- Glottolog: None
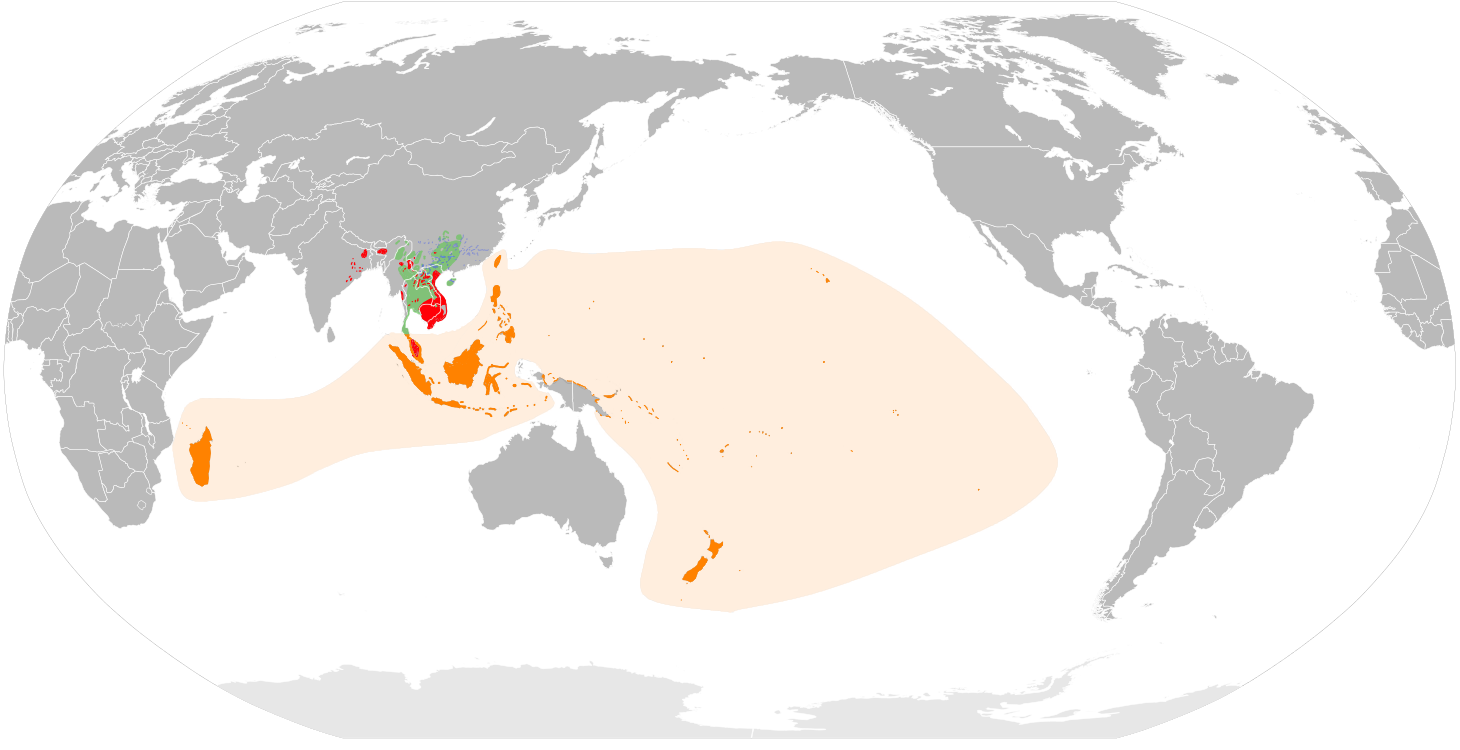
- The distribution of Austric languages Austroasiatic Austronesian Kra-Dai Hmong-Mien

The Austric languages are a proposed language family that includes the Austronesian languages spoken in Taiwan, Maritime Southeast Asia, the Pacific Islands, and Madagascar, as well as Kra–Dai and Austroasiatic languages spoken in Mainland Southeast Asia and South Asia. A genetic relationship between these language families is seen as plausible by some scholars, but remains unproven.

Additionally, Hmong–Mien languages are included by some linguists, and even Japanese was speculated to be Austric in an early version of the hypothesis by Paul K. Benedict.

== History ==
The Austric macrofamily was first proposed by the German missionary Wilhelm Schmidt in 1906. He showed phonological, morphological, and lexical evidence to support the existence of an Austric phylum consisting of Austroasiatic and Austronesian. (Note: The terms "Austroasiatic" and "Austronesian" were in fact both coined by Schmidt. The previous common designations "Mon-Khmer" and "Malayo-Polynesian" are still in use, but each with a scope that is more limited than "Austroasiatic" and "Austronesian".) Schmidt's proposal had a mixed reception among scholars of Southeast Asian languages, and received only little scholarly attention in the following decades.

Research interest into Austric resurged in the late 20th century, culminating in a series of articles by La Vaughn H. Hayes, who presented a corpus of Proto-Austric vocabulary together with a reconstruction of Proto-Austric phonology, and by Lawrence Reid, focussing on morphological evidence.

== Evidence ==
Reid (2005) lists the following pairs as "probable" cognates between Proto-Austroasiatic and Proto-Austronesian.

Gloss	ashes	dog	snake	belly	eye	father	mother	rotten	buy
Proto-Austroasiatic	*qabuh	*cu(q)	*[su](l̩)aR	*taʔal/*tiʔal	*mə(n)ta(q)	*(qa)ma(ma)	*(na)na	*ɣok	*pə[l̩]i
Proto-Austronesian	*qabu	*asu	*SulaR	*tiaN	*maCa	*t-ama	*t-ina	*ma-buRuk	*beli

Among the morphological evidence, he compares reconstructed affixes such as the following, and notes that shared infixes are less likely to be borrowed (for a further discussion of infixes in Southeast Asian languages, see also Barlow 2022).

- prefix *pa- 'causative' (Proto-Austroasiatic, Proto-Austronesian)
- infix *-um- 'agentive' (Proto-Austroasiatic, Proto-Austronesian)
- infix *-in- 'instrumental' (Proto-Austroasiatic), 'nominalizer' (Proto-Austronesian)

Below are 10 selected Austric lexical comparisons by Diffloth (1994), as cited in Sidwell & Reid (2021):

Gloss	Proto-Austroasiatic	Proto-Austronesian
‘fish’	*ʔaka̰ːʔ	*Sikan
‘dog’	*ʔac(ṵə)ʔ	*asu
‘wood’	*kəɟh(uː)ʔ	*kaSi
‘eye’	*ma̰t	*maCa
‘bone’	*ɟlʔaːŋ	*CuqelaN
‘hair’	*s(ɔ)k	*bukeS
‘bamboo rat’	Khmu dəkən	Malay dəkan
‘molar’	Khmer thkìəm	Malay gərham
‘left’	p-Monic *ɟwiːʔ	*ka-wiʀi
‘ashes’	Stieng *buh	*qabu

== Extended proposals ==
The first extension to Austric was first proposed Wilhelm Schmidt himself, who speculated about including Japanese within Austric, mainly because of assumed similarities between Japanese and the Austronesian languages. While the proposal about a link between Austronesian and Japanese still enjoys some following as a separate hypothesis, the inclusion of Japanese was not adopted by later proponents of Austric.

In 1942, Paul K. Benedict provisionally accepted the Austric hypothesis and extended it to include the Kra–Dai (Thai–Kadai) languages as an immediate sister branch to Austronesian, and further speculated on the possibility to include the Hmong–Mien (Miao–Yao) languages as well. However, he later abandoned the Austric proposal in favor of an extended version of the Austro-Tai hypothesis.

Sergei Starostin adopted Benedict's extended 1942 version of Austric (i.e. including Kra–Dai and Hmong–Mien) within the framework of his larger Dené–Daic proposal, with Austric as a coordinate branch to Dené–Caucasian, as shown in the tree below.

- Dene-Daic
  - - Austric sensu lato
      - - Hmong–Mien
        - Austroasiatic
      - - Austro-Tai
          - Kra–Dai
          - Austronesian
  - Dené–Caucasian

Another long-range proposal for wider connections of Austric was brought forward by John Bengtson, who grouped Nihali and Ainu together with Austroasiatic, Austronesian, Hmong–Mien, and Kra–Dai in a "Greater Austric" family.

== Reception ==
In the second half of the last century, Paul K. Benedict raised a vocal critique of the Austric proposal, eventually calling it an 'extinct' proto-language.

Hayes' lexical comparisons, which were presented as supporting evidence for Austric between 1992 and 2001, were criticized for the greater part as methodologically unsound by several reviewers. Robert Blust, a leading scholar in the field of Austronesian comparative linguistics, pointed out "the radical disjunction of morphological and lexical evidence" which characterizes the Austric proposal; while he accepts the morphological correspondences between Austronesian and Austroasiatic as possible evidence for a remote genetic relationship, he considers the lexical evidence unconvincing.

A 2015 analysis using the Automated Similarity Judgment Program (ASJP) did not support the Austric hypothesis. In this analysis, the supposed "core" components of Austric were assigned to two separate, unrelated clades: Austro-Tai and Austroasiatic-Japonic. Note however that ASJP is not widely accepted among historical linguists as an adequate method to establish or evaluate relationships between language families.

== Distributions ==
Distribution of Austroasiatic languages

Distribution of Austronesian languages

Distribution of Kra–Dai languages

Distribution of Hmong–Mien languages

== See also ==
- East Asian languages
- Austro-Tai languages
- Sino-Austronesian languages
- Mainland Southeast Asia linguistic area
- Classification of Southeast Asian languages
- Haplogroup O-M175
