= Macrofamily =

Proposed genetic language family group

In historical linguistics, a macrofamily (also called a superfamily or superphylum) is a hypothetical higher-order grouping of languages, composed of multiple language families and/or isolates. Some scholars, such as Campbell, view this designation as superfluous or redundant, preferring "language family" for those classifications for which there is consensus and "distant genetic relationship" for those which lack consensus, whether due to lack of documentation, lack of scholarship, or time depth thought by linguists too great for accurate reconstruction, but which have not been outright rejected or definitely discredited.

Examples of proposed macro-families range from relatively recent such as East Asian, Macro-Jê, Macro-Waikurúan, Macro-Mayan, Macro-Siouan, Penutian, Dené–Yeniseian and Congo-Saharan (Niger-Congo) to older ones such as Austric, Dené–Caucasian, Eurasiatic, Nostratic, Borean, Altaic, Ural-Altaic, or Indo-Uralic. These proposals are variously considered widely rejected and positively discredited (as with Nostratic), debated and uncertain (as with Dené-Yeniseian), or largely accepted and generally proven (as with Macro-Jê).

Rarely, the term has also been applied to exceptionally old, large, or diverse language families, such as Afro-Asiatic.

== See also ==
- Language family
- List of language families
- List of proposed language families
- Lumpers and splitters
- Father Tongue hypothesis
- Classification of Southeast Asian languages
- Classification of indigenous languages of the Americas
- Borean languages
