= Vladimir Dybo =

Russian linguist (1931–2023)

- Владимир Дыбо
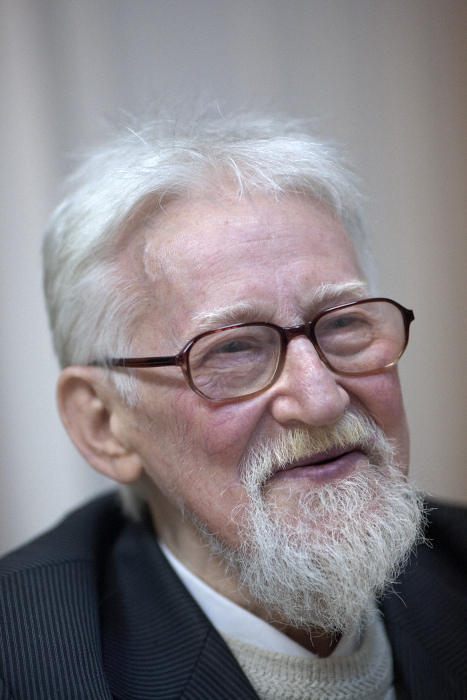
- Dybo in 2011
- Born: 30 April 1931; Pirohivka, Shostka Raion, Sumy Oblast, Ukrainian SSR, Soviet Union
- Died: 7 May 2023 (aged 92); Tarusa, Kaluga Oblast, Russia
- Education: State University of Gorky
- Scientific career
- Fields: Linguistics
- Workplaces: Institute for Slavic Studies of the Russian Academy of Sciences, Institute of Oriental Cultures and Antiquities, Russian State University for the Humanities
- Academic advisors: Vyacheslav Ivanov

Vladimir Antonovich Dybo (Russian: Влади́мир Анто́нович Дыбо́; 30 April 1931 – 7 May 2023) was a Soviet and Russian linguist, Doctor Nauk in Philological Sciences (1979), Professor (1992), Academician of the Russian Academy of Sciences (2011). A specialist in comparative historical linguistics and accentology, he was one of the founders of the Moscow School of Comparative Linguistics. Dybo's law is named after him.

== Biography ==
Dybo graduated from the Department of Russian language and Literature of the Faculty of History and Philology of State University of Gorky (1954) and undertook postgraduate studies at the department of common and comparative linguistics of the Faculty of Philology of Moscow State University. From 1958, he worked as a research fellow at the Institute for Slavic Studies of the Soviet Academy of Sciences. He was the chief researcher at the Department of Slavic Linguistics.

In 1962, Dybo received his candidate degree at the Institute of Slavic Studies on The problem of correlation of two Balto-Slavic series of accentual correspondences in a verb. In 1979, he received his doctoral degree on An attempt at reconstruction of the system of Proto-Slavic accent paradigms.

On 26 May 2000, he was elected a corresponding member of the Russian Academy of Sciences in the Department of Literature and Language (Linguistics). Since 22 December 2011, he was a full member (academician) of the Russian Academy of Sciences in the Department of Historical and Philological Sciences.

His wife, Valeria Churganova (1931–1998), and daughter, Anna Dybo (born 1959), are also well-known linguists.

Dybo died on 7 May 2023, at the age of 92.

== Positions ==
Dybo was director of the Center for Comparative Studies, Institute of Oriental Cultures and Antiquities, Russian State University for the Humanities; gave lectures in Comparative grammar of Slavic languages (Proto-Slavic reconstruction); Slavic comparative historical accentology; Baltic comparative historical accentology; Typology and Genesis of paradigmatic accent systems. He directed postgraduates and doctoral students; under his leadership, 7 candidate dissertations and 2 doctoral dissertations were successfully defended.

Dybo was the editor-in-chief of the Journal of Language Relationship, and a member of the Editorial Board of the journal Topics in the study of language. He was also a member of the Academic Council of the Russian State University for the Humanities and the Dissertation Council in the specialties comparative historical and typological linguistics and languages of Asia, Africa, the natives of Australia and America in the same place. Additionally, Dybo was a full member of the Russian Academy of Natural Sciences (1992).

Dybo was also the Chairman of the Moscow Linguistic Society, organizer of the Vladislav Illich-Svitych Nostratic Seminar.

Dybo was awarded the medal In Commemoration of the 850th Anniversary of Moscow.

== Scientific research ==
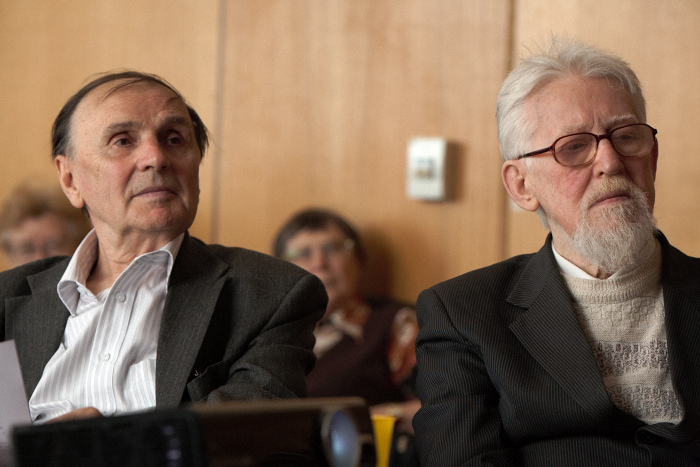
Academicians Andrey Zaliznyak and Vladimir Dybo (2011)

The author of about 200 scientific publications, including 7 monographs.

His main works are devoted to the comparative-historical grammar of Slavic, Baltic, Iranian, Indo-European and Nostratic languages, comparative historical accentology and historical typology of accent systems, accentology of Northwest Caucasian languages and Central Saharan languages, and Japanese. He made a significant contribution (along with Vladislav Illich-Svitych, Sergei Nikolaev, Andrey Zaliznyak) to the reconstruction of the ancient Balto-Slavic accent system.

Dybo developed the theory of distant kinship of languages and reconstruction of paleo culture based on language data. He was one of the most authoritative specialists in these fields in Russia and in the world. In particular, he built for the first time a coherent concept of Slavic comparative historical accentology, as well as a typology of paradigmatic accent systems.

Dybo managed a number of projects under grants from the Russian Foundation for Basic Research and Russian Humanitarian Science Foundation, and coordinated the work on the collective work Fundamentals of Slavic accentology under the program of fundamental research of the Department of Historical and Philological Sciences of the Russian Academy of Sciences.
