= Georgiy Starostin =

Russian linguist (born 1976)

- Гео́ргий Серге́евич Ста́ростин
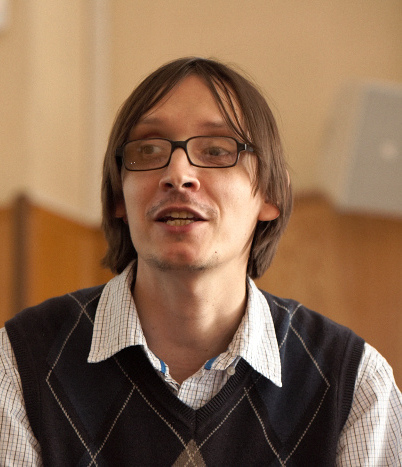
- Starostin in 2011
- Born: 4 July 1976 (age 50)
- Parent: Sergei Starostin

Academic work
- Discipline: Linguist
- Main interests: Historical linguistics; Tower of Babel project

Georgiy Sergeevich "George" Starostin (Russian: Гео́ргий Серге́евич Ста́ростин; born 4 July 1976) is a Russian linguist and the son of the late historical linguist Sergei Starostin (1953–2005).

Starostin is also known as a self-published music reviewer, author of the Only Solitaire Blog, which he named after a Jethro Tull song.

== Research ==
Starostin focuses almost exclusively on maintaining the following of his father's projects: the Evolution of Human Languages project; The Tower of Babel, a publicly searchable online database containing information about many Eurasia's language families; and STARLING, a software package to aid comparative linguists.

=== Evolution of Human Languages ===
The Evolution of Human Languages (EHL) is an international project – of which Starostin inherited his father's membership – on "the linguistic prehistory of humanity" coordinated by the Santa Fe Institute. The project distinguishes about 6000 languages currently spoken around the world, and aims to provide a detailed classification similar to the accepted classification of biological species.

Their idea is that "all representatives of the species Homo sapiens presumably share a common origin, [so] it would be natural to suppose – although this is a goal yet to be achieved – that all human languages also go back to some common source. Most existing classifications, however, do not go beyond some 300-400 language families that are relatively easy to discern. This restriction has natural reasons: languages must have been spoken and constantly evolving for at least 40,000 years (and quite probably more), while any two languages separated from a common source inevitably lose almost all superficially common features after some 6,000-7,000 years".

=== Tower of Babel project ===
The Tower of Babel by Pieter Brueghel the Elder (1563)

The Tower of Babel is an international etymological database project coordinated by the Center of Comparative Linguistics of the Russian State University for the Humanities. The project aims to "join efforts in the research of long range connections between established language families of the world. The Internet is used to combine these attempts and to build up a commonly accessible database of roots, or etyma reconstructed for the World's major (and minor) linguistic stocks." Starostin's role specifically is for hosting the website.

=== Starling database program ===
The Starling database management system software program is part of his father's Tower of Babel project. This software program aims to support "various types of linguistic text and database processing, including handling of linguistic fonts in the DOS and WINDOWS operating systems, operations with linguistic databases and Internet presentation of linguistic data".

== Publications ==
Starostin has written a number of articles on Dravidian, Yeniseian, Khoisan, and language isolates. A selection includes:

- 1995, "The Structure of the Ket Verbal Form", with KY Reshetnikov, in: Ket Volume, issue 4 (1995, Moscow). (Russian language)
- 1995, "The Morphology of the Kott Verb and the Reconstruction of the Proto-Yenisseian Verbal System", in: Ket Volume, issue 4 (1995, Moscow). (Russian language)
- 1997, "Alveolar Consonants in Proto-Dravidian: One or More?", in: "Proceedings on South Asian Languages" (July 1–4, 1997), Moscow .
- 2002, "On The Genetic Affiliation Of The Elamite Language", in: Mother Tongue, Vol. 7, 2002.
- 2003, "A lexicostatistical approach towards reconstructing Proto-Khoisan", in: Mother Tongue, Vol. 8, 2003.
- 2005, "Some Aspects Of The Historical Development Of Clicks In Khoisan Languages", in: "Aspects of Comparative Linguistics", v. 1 (2005, Moscow, RSUH Publishers). (Russian language)
- 2008 "From modern Khoisan languages to Proto-Khoisan: The value of intermediate reconstructions" (originally in: Aspects of Comparative Linguistics 3 (2008), 337–470, Moscow: RSUH Publishers)

== See also ==
- Moscow School of Comparative Linguistics
