= Václav Blažek =

Czech historical linguist (born 1959)

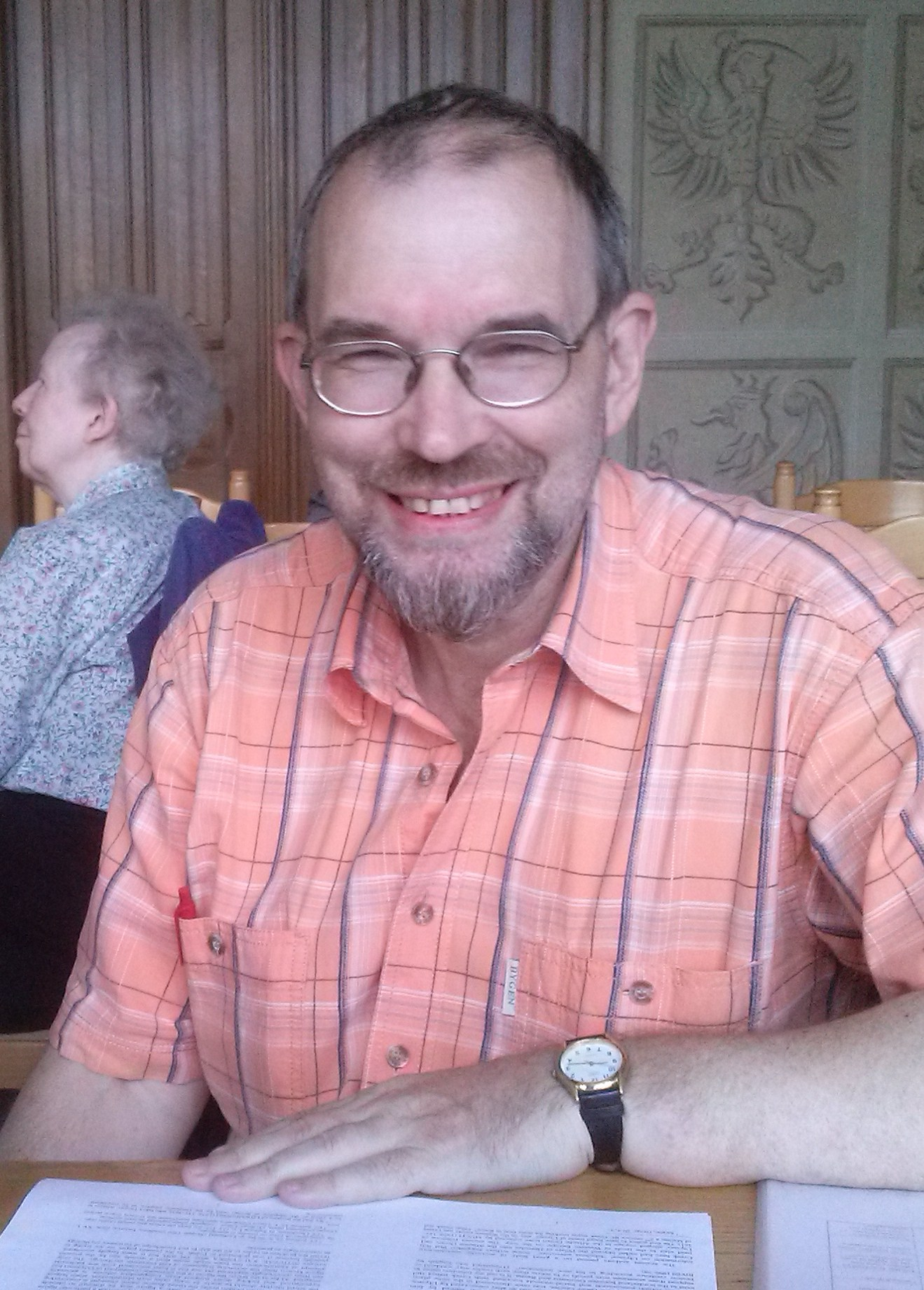
- Václav Blažek in Toruń, Poland (June 2015)
- Born: 23 April 1959 (age 67); Sokolov, Czechoslovakia
- Occupation: Linguist

Academic work
- Institutions: Masaryk University and University of West Bohemia
- Main interests: Historical linguistics

Václav Blažek (born 23 April 1959) is a Czech historical linguist. He is a professor at Masaryk University in Brno and also teaches at the University of West Bohemia in Plzeň.

His major interests include Indo-European languages, Uralic languages, Altaic languages, Afroasiatic (Hamito-Semitic) languages, Nostratic languages, Dené–Caucasian languages, and mathematical linguistics (lexicostatistics and glottochronology).

In his book Numerals, Blažek discusses words for numerals in several language families of Eurasia and Africa (Indo-European, Uralic, Altaic, Kartvelian, Egyptian, Berber, Nubian, and Saharan), with briefer discussions of numerals in other languages around the world.
