= Dené–Caucasian languages =

Proposed language family

Dené–Caucasian
- Sino-Caucasian
- (widely rejected)
- Geographic distribution: scattered in Eurasia and North America
- Linguistic classification: Hypothetical language family
- Subdivisions: Na-Dené (including Haida); Yeniseian; North Caucasian; Sino-Tibetan; Burushaski; Vasconic; Hattic †; Hurro-Urartian †; Tyrsenian † (sometimes included); Sumerian † (sometimes included); Almosan (rarely included)

Language codes
- Glottolog: None
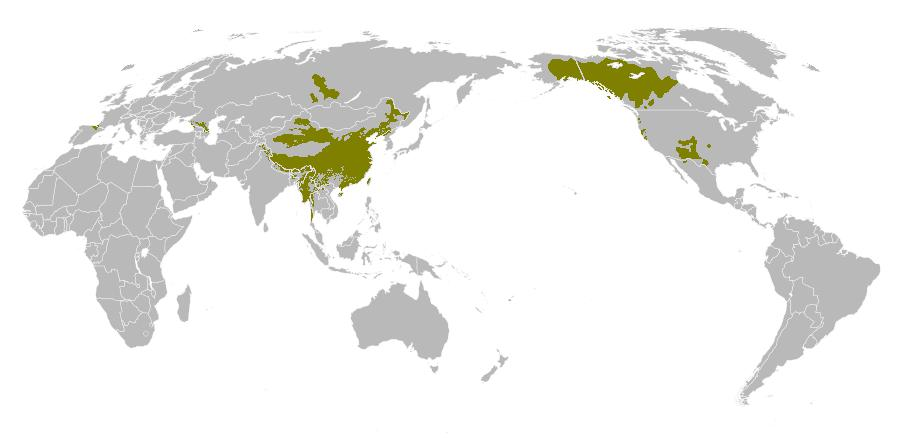
- Notes: † indicates a dead language

Dené–Caucasian is a discredited language family proposal that includes widely-separated language groups spoken in the Northern Hemisphere: Sino-Tibetan languages, Yeniseian languages and Burushaski in Asia; Na-Dené languages in North America; as well as Vasconic languages (including Basque) and North Caucasian languages from Europe.

A narrower connection specifically between North American Na-Dené and Siberian Yeniseian (the Dené–Yeniseian languages hypothesis) was proposed by Edward Vajda in 2008, and was met with some acceptance within the community of professional linguists. The validity of the rest of the family, however, is viewed as doubtful or rejected by nearly all historical linguists.

== History of the hypothesis ==
Classifications similar to Dené–Caucasian were put forward in the 20th century by Alfredo Trombetti, Edward Sapir, Robert Bleichsteiner, Karl Bouda, E. J. Furnée, René Lafon, Robert Shafer, Olivier Guy Tailleur, Morris Swadesh, Vladimir N. Toporov, and other scholars.

Morris Swadesh included all of the members of Dené–Caucasian in a family that he called "Basque-Dennean" (when writing in English, 2006/1971: 223) or "vascodene" (when writing in Spanish, 1959: 114). It was named for Basque and Navajo, the languages at its geographic extremes. According to Swadesh (1959: 114), it included "Basque, the Caucasian languages, Ural-Altaic, Dravidian, Tibeto-Burman, Chinese, Austronesian, Japanese, Chukchi (Siberia), Eskimo-Aleut, Wakash, and Na-Dene", and possibly "Sumerian". Swadesh's Basque-Dennean thus differed from Dené–Caucasian in including (1) Uralic, Altaic, Japanese, Chukotian, and Eskimo-Aleut (languages which are classed as Eurasiatic by the followers of Sergei Starostin and those of Joseph Greenberg), (2) Dravidian, which is classed as Nostratic by Starostin's school, and (3) Austronesian (which according to Starostin is indeed related to Dené–Caucasian, but only at the next stage up, which he termed Dené–Daic, and only via Austric (see Starostin's Borean macrofamily). Swadesh's colleague Mary Haas attributes the origin of the Basque-Dennean hypothesis to Edward Sapir.

In the 1980s, Sergei Starostin, using strict linguistic methods (proposing regular phonological correspondences, reconstructions, glottochronology, etc.), became the first to put the idea that the Caucasian, Yeniseian and Sino-Tibetan languages are related on firmer ground. In 1991, Sergei L. Nikolaev added the Na-Dené languages to Starostin's classification.

In 1996, John D. Bengtson added the Vasconic languages (including Basque, its extinct relative or ancestor Aquitanian, and possibly Iberian), and in 1997 he proposed the inclusion of Burushaski. The same year, in his article for Mother Tongue, Bengtson concluded that Sumerian might have been a remnant of a distinct subgroup of the Dené–Caucasian languages.

In 1998, Vitaly V. Shevoroshkin rejected the Amerind affinity of the Almosan (Algonquian-Wakashan) languages, suggesting instead that they had a relationship with Dené–Caucasian. Several years later, he offered a number of lexical and phonological correspondences between the North Caucasian, Salishan, and Wakashan languages, concluding that Salishan and Wakashan may represent a distinct branch of North Caucasian and that their separation from it must postdate the dissolution of the Northeast Caucasian unity (Avar-Andi-Tsezian), which took place around the 2nd or 3rd millennium BC.

== Academic concerns with Dené–Caucasian ==
The mainstream of professional linguists have expressed several concerns about this hypothesis.

The first concern is the somewhat heavy reliance on the reconstruction of Proto-(North-)Caucasian by Starostin and Nikolayev. This reconstruction contains much uncertainty due to the extreme complexity of the sound systems of the Caucasian languages; the sound correspondences between these languages are difficult to trace.

The use of the reconstruction of Proto-Sino-Tibetan by Peiros and Starostin, parts of which have been criticized on various grounds, although Starostin himself has proposed a few revisions. All reconstructions of Proto-Sino-Tibetan suffer from the facts that many languages of the huge Sino-Tibetan family are underresearched and that the shape of the Sino-Tibetan tree is poorly known and partly controversial.

Another issue is use of Starostin's reconstruction of Proto-Yeniseian rather than the competing one by Vajda or that by Werner.

The long range of the proposal is the most common concern.

== Family tree proposals ==
=== Starostin's theory ===
The Dené–Caucasian family tree and approximate divergence dates (estimated by modified glottochronology) proposed by S. A. Starostin and his colleagues from the Tower of Babel project:

- Dené–Caucasian languages [8,700 BCE]
  - Na-Dené languages (Athabascan–Eyak–Tlingit)
  - Sino-Vasconic languages [7,900 BCE]
    - Vasconic (see below)
    - Sino-Caucasian languages [6,200 BCE]
      - Burushaski
      - Caucaso-Sino-Yeniseian [5,900 BCE]
        - North Caucasian languages
        - Sino-Yeniseian [5,100 BCE]
          - Yeniseian languages
          - Sino-Tibetan languages

=== Bengtson's theory ===
John D. Bengtson groups Basque, Caucasian and Burushaski together in a Macro-Caucasian (earlier Vasco-Caucasian) family (see the section on Macro-Caucasian below). According to him, it is as yet premature to propose other nodes or subgroupings, but he notes that Sumerian seems to share the same number of isoglosses with the (geographically) western branches as with the eastern ones:

- Dené–Caucasian
  - The Macro-Caucasian family
    - Basque
    - North Caucasian
    - Burushaski
  - Sumerian
  - Sino-Tibetan
  - Yeniseian
  - Na-Dené

== Proposed subbranches ==
=== Macro-Caucasian ===
John Bengtson (2008) proposes that, within Dené–Caucasian, the Caucasian languages form a branch together with Basque and Burushaski, based on many shared word roots as well as shared grammar such as:

- the Caucasian plural/collective ending *-/rV/ of nouns, which is preserved in many modern Caucasian languages, as well as sometimes fossilized in singular nouns with collective meaning; one of the many Burushaski plural endings for class I and II (masculine and feminine) nouns is -/aro/.
- the consonant -/t/, which is inserted between the components of some Basque compound nouns and can be compared to the East Caucasian element -*/du/ which is inserted between the noun stem and the endings of cases other than the ergative.
- the presence of compound case endings (agglutinated from the suffixes of two different cases) in all three branches.
- case endings

=== Karasuk ===
George van Driem has proposed that the Yeniseian languages are the closest known relatives of Burushaski, based on a small number of similarities in grammar and lexicon. The Karasuk theory as proposed by van Driem does not address other language families that are hypothesized to belong to Dené–Caucasian, so whether the Karasuk hypothesis is compatible or not with the Macro-Caucasian hypothesis remains to be investigated.

== See also ==
- Dené–Yeniseian languages
- Language families and languages
- Proto-language
- Borean languages
- Haplogroup C-M217 (Y-DNA)
- Sino-Uralic
