= Dictionary (disambiguation) =

A dictionary is a list of words and their meanings.

Dictionary or dictionaries may also refer to:

- Encyclopedic dictionary, sometimes titled Dictionary of...
  - Biographical dictionary
- Dictionary (game), a word-definition party game

== Computing ==
- Data dictionary, a centralised set of metadata in a database management system
- Dictionary (data structure), an abstract data type for a set of pairs
- Dictionary (software), an app in Mac OS X v10.4 and later
- Dictionary attack, a technique to determine a password
- A dictionary coder, a data compression method that makes use of a central "dictionary"
- Dictionary.com, a dictionary website

== Other uses ==
- "Dictionaries", a Series D episode of the television series QI (2006)

== See also ==
- Pictionary, visual word/phrase guessing game
- DICT
- Diction
- Lexicon (disambiguation)
- Wiktionary, the official dictionary of the Wikimedia Foundation
- Thesaurus
- Glossary
- Wikipedia:Glossary
