= Harold C. Fleming =

American linguist

Harold Fleming
- Born: Harold Crane Fleming; December 23, 1926
- Died: April 29, 2015 (aged 88)
- Occupations: linguist, anthropologist, writer
- Writing career
- Notable works: The age-grading culture of East Africa: an historical inquiry (1965); A new taxonomic hypothesis: Borean or Boralean (1991)

Harold Crane Fleming (December 23, 1926 – April 29, 2015) was an American anthropologist and historical linguist specializing in the cultures and languages of the Horn of Africa. As an adherent of the Four Field School of American anthropology, he stressed the integration of physical anthropology, linguistics, archaeology, and cultural anthropology in solving anthropological problems.

Fleming was motivated by the civil rights movement early in his life, and committed the rest of his life to studies to promote equal opportunity.

== Career ==
Since 1965, Fleming had been affiliated with Boston University, continuing to the present as Research Fellow in the African Studies Center and Emeritus Professor of Anthropology. He conducted extensive field work in Northeast Africa, mostly in Ethiopia. Using data from field work by himself and others, Fleming studied and published touching each of the four language groupings in Ethiopia: Semitic, Cushitic (1976), Omotic (1969, 1970), and Nilo-Saharan, plus the enigmatic Shabo (2002) and Ongota (2006).

Early in his career, Fleming published a paper (Fleming 1969) that outlined an important taxonomic proposal, claiming that what had up to then been known as the "Western Cushitic" language family was not a part of Cushitic at all, but instead makes up a sixth primary branch of Afroasiatic, for which he coined the name Omotic. The proposal has since been widely but not universally accepted. He continued in the vein of solving taxonomic problems involving the languages spoken in Africa and worldwide (Fleming 1976, 1987, 1988, 1991, 2002, 2006, etc.).

Fleming was a vocal advocate of, and practitioner in, the effort to extend the application of historical linguistic methods as far as possible into the past. He recommended integrating its results with those of physical anthropology, genetics, and archaeology, in order to produce a unified view of human prehistory. Fleming was also a strong supporter of the sometimes controversial proposals of Joseph Greenberg, emphasizing the success of Greenberg's classification of "1500 [African] languages into four large taxa where almost all have stayed ever since" (Fleming 2000-2001).

In 1986, Fleming met the young members of the "Moscow Circle" of historical linguists. He was deeply impressed by the long-range linguistic probing of scholars in Moscow who were trying to extend genetic taxonomy of human languages beyond the levels achieved in the 1950s and 1960s. In the fall of 1986, Fleming began circulating letters to linguists and anthropologists outside of Russia. By the fourth issue (November 1987), the newsletter had acquired a more formal appearance and the name Mother Tongue.

In 1989, what had been the "Long Range Comparison Club" was legally incorporated as the Association for the Study of Language in Prehistory (ASLIP). Fleming has served as President of ASLIP (1988–1996), Secretary-Treasurer (1996–98), and Vice President and Acting Treasurer (2004–present). ASLIP's mission is "to encourage international, interdisciplinary information sharing, discussion, and debate among biogeneticists, paleoanthropologists, archaeologists, and historical linguists on questions relating to the emerging synthesis on language origins and ancestral human spoken languages." Since 1995, ASLIP has published the journal Mother Tongue.

A festschrift honoring Fleming was published in 2008. In this volume, there are sections that reflect Fleming's wide interests, including languages and cultures in Africa, "Languages of Eurasia, Oceania, and the Americas", and "Human origins, Language origins, and Proto-Sapiens language".

== A selection of works by Harold C. Fleming ==
- 1965. The age-grading culture of East Africa: an historical inquiry. University of Pittsburgh.
- 1969. "Asa and Aramanik: Cushitic Hunters in Masai-Land." In Ethnology, VIII.
- 1969. "The classification of West Cushitic within Hamito-Semitic." In Eastern African History, edited by Daniel McCall, Norman Bennett, and Jeffrey Butler, 3-27. Boston University Studies in African History 3.
- 1976. "Cushitic and Omotic." In Language in Ethiopia, edited by M. Lionel Bender et al., 34-53.
- 1978. "Ethiopians and East Africans." In The International Journal of African Historical Studies, XI, 2.
- 1978. "Microtaxonomy: Language and blood groups in the Horn of Africa." In Proceedings of the Fifth International Conference of Ethiopian Studies, Session B, April 13–16, 1978, edited by Robert Hess, 25-49.
- 1979-1980. "Linguistic and biological view on Somali prehistoric relations." In Somalia and the World, 34-37.
- 1982. "Kuliak external relations: Step one." In Nilotic Studies, from Proceedings of the International Symposium on Languages and History of the Nilotic Peoples, Cologne, January 4–6, 1982, Volume 2, 423-478.
- 1987. "Hadza and Sandawe genetic relations." In Proceedings of the International Symposium on African Hunters and Gatherers, edited by Franz Rottland, 157-189. Sprache und Geschichte in Africa, Volume 7.2.
- 1988. "Towards a definitive classification of human languages", review of A Guide to the World’s Languages by Merritt Ruhlen. Diachronica 4, 159-223.
- 1990. “A Grammatical Sketch of Dime (Dim‑Af) of the Lower Omo.” Omotic Language Studies ed. by Richard Hayward, 494–583. London, S.O.A.S., University of London.
- 1991. "A new taxonomic hypothesis: Borean or Boralean." Mother Tongue 14 (Newsletter of ASLIP), 16 pp.
- 2000. "Glottalization in Eastern Armenian." Journal of Indo-European Studies 28.1-2, 155-196.
- 2000-2001. "Joseph H. Greenberg: A tribute and an appraisal." Mother Tongue: The Journal 6, 9-28.
- 2002. "Shabo: A new African phylum or a special relic of Old Nilo-Saharan?" Mother Tongue: The Journal 7, 1-38.
- 2002. "Afrasian and its closest relatives: The Borean hypothesis" (Abstract of paper.)
- 2006. Ongota: A Decisive Language in African Prehistory. Wiesbaden: Otto Harrassowitz.

== See also ==
- Afroasiatic languages
- Ethiopian studies
- Somali studies
- Mother Tongue (journal)
