= John Bengtson =

American linguist

- Born: 1948
- Died: March 3, 2024 (aged 75–76)
- Occupation: Linguist

Academic work
- Main interests: Historical linguistics

John D. Bengtson (1948–2024) was an American historical and anthropological linguist. He had been president and vice-president of the Association for the Study of Language in Prehistory, and had served as editor (or co-editor) of the journal Mother Tongue (1996–2003, 2007–2024). Since 2001, he had been a member/researcher of Evolution of Human Languages, an international project on the linguistic prehistory of humanity coordinated by the Santa Fe Institute. His areas of work included Scandinavian languages and linguistics, Indo-European linguistics, the proposed Dené–Caucasian language family and paleolinguistics.

== Publications ==
- Bengtson, John D. 1994. (with Merritt Ruhlen) Global Etymologies. In M. Ruhlen, On the Origin of Languages: Studies in Linguistic Taxonomy. Stanford, CA: Stanford University Press.
- 1994. Edward Sapir and the 'Sino-Dene' Hypothesis. Anthropological Science 102.3: 207-230.
- 1997. Ein Vergleich von Buruschaski und Nordkaukasisch. Georgica 20: 88-94.
- 1998. Caucasian and Sino-Tibetan: A Hypothesis of S.A. Starostin. General Linguistics 36.1/2: 33-49.
- 2008. Materials for a Comparative Grammar of the Dene-Caucasian (Sino-Caucasian) Languages. In Aspects of Comparative Linguistics, v. 3., pp. 45–118. Moscow: RSUH Publishers.
- 2008. (Ed.) In Hot Pursuit of Language in Prehistory: Essays in the four fields of anthropology In honor Harold Crane Fleming. Amsterdam: John Benjamins.
- 2008. The Languages of Northern Eurasia: Inference to the Best Explanation. In In Hot Pursuit of Language in Prehistory, J.D. Bengtson (ed.), pp. 241–262.
- 2009. (with Václav Blažek) Ainu and Austric: Evidence of Genetic Relationship. Journal of Language Relationship 2: 1-24.
- 2010. “Dene–Yeniseian” and the Rest of Dene–Caucasian: Part 3: The Burusho–Yeniseian (Karasuk) Hypothesis; Part 4: Burusho–Dene. In Working Papers in Athabaskan Languages (Alaska Native Language Center Working Papers No. 8), ed. by Siri Tuttle & Justin Spence, pp. 118. Fairbanks: Alaska Native Language Center.
- 2011. (with Václav Blažek) On the Burushaski–Indo–European hypothesis by I. Čašule. Journal of Language Relationship 6: 25-63.
- 2011. (with Pierre J. Bancel & Alain Matthey de l’Etang) Back to Proto–Sapiens (Part 2). The Global Kinship Terms Papa, Mama and Kaka . In: Kinship, Language, and Prehistory: Per Hage and the Renaissance in Kinship Studies, Ed. by Doug Jones & Bojka Milicic, pp. 38–45. Salt Lake City: University of Utah Press.
- 2013. (with Harold C. Fleming, Stephen L. Zegura, James B. Harrod & Shomarka O.Y. Keita) The Early Dispersions of Homo sapiens and Proto–Human from Africa. Mother Tongue 18: 143-187.
- 2015. (with George Starostin) The Dene–Sino–Caucasian hypothesis: state of the art and perspectives. Discussion draft posted on Academia.edu, 2015.
- 2015. (with Pierre J. Bancel & Alain Matthey de l’Etang) A Universal Proto-Interjection System in Modern-Day Humans. Mother Tongue 20: 249-261.
- 2016. (with Florent Dieterlen) Confirmation de l’ancienne extension des Basques par l’étude des dialectes de l’Europe de l’Ouest romane. [Confirmation of the former extension of the Basques from a study of the western Romance dialects of Europe.] Journal of Language Relationship 14/1: 1-27.
- 2016. Iarl and Iormun-; Arya- and Aryaman- : A Study in Indo-European Comparative Mythology. Comparative Mythology 2.1: 33–67. (December 2016)
- 2017. The Anthropological Context of Euskaro-Caucasian. Iran and the Caucasus 21.1: 75-91. doi:10.1163/1573384X-90000008
- 2018. How Do You Solve a Problem Like Euskera? Romance Philology 72: 15-33.
- 2019. (with Corinna Leschber) Notes on Euskaro-Caucasian (Vasconic) Substratum in western Indo-European Languages. Wékʷos. Revue d' études Indo-européennes 5: 11-50.
- 2019. ‘Where there is fire, there is smoke’: A study in the Euskaro-Caucasian hypothesis. Slovo aslovesnost 80: 3–25.
- 2020. Gerber’s ‘The Dene-Kusunda Hypothesis’: Archaeology and Genealogy of Linguistic Macro-Families and Its Significance in Tracing the History of Human Language. Man In India 100.1-2: 37-59.
- 2020. Comments on ‘Na-Dene and Beyond’; Sino-Dene (updated); the position of Haida. Mother Tongue 22: 11-42. doi:10.1515/mot-2020-220104
- 2020. Some Notes about Dene-Caucasian. Mother Tongue 22: 133-150. doi:10.1515/mot-2020-220110
- 2020. (with Pierre J. Bancel & Alain Matthey de l’Etang) The Proto-Sapiens Prohibitive/Negative Particle *Ma. Mother Tongue 22: 223-240. doi:10.1515/mot-2020-220112
- 2021. (with Pierre J. Bancel): On The Pronoun Roots N ‘1sg’ and M ‘2sg’ In the Native Languages of the Americas and Their Historical Meaning. Mother Tongue 23: 33–53. doi:10.31826/mot-2021-230106
- 2021. (with Corinna Leschber): Notes on some Pre-Greek words in relation to Euskaro-Caucasian (North Caucasian + Basque). Journal of Language Relationship / Voprosy jazykovogo rodstva 19/2: 71-98. doi:10.1515/jlr-2021-191-210
- 2022. Basque and its Closest Relatives: A New Paradigm. An Updated Study of the Euskaro-Caucasian (Vasco-Caucasian) Hypothesis. Piscataway, New Jersey: Gorgias Press.
