= Lexicon (disambiguation) =

The lexicon of a language (or field of study) is its complete vocabulary.

Lexicon or lexica may also refer to:

== Reference works ==
- A dictionary
- An encyclopedic dictionary
- A word list
- The late tenth-century Suda – oft cited as "Sudae Lexicon" or "Souidas's Lexicon"

== Arts and entertainment ==
=== Fiction ===
- Lexicon (novel), a 2013 sci-fi novel by Max Barry
- The Harry Potter Lexicon, a literary fan website (called "the Lexicon" by users)
- Lexicon, the home planet of WordGirl, star of an educational TV show

=== Gaming ===
- Lexicon Gaming Convention, an event for board games held in Lexington, Kentucky, US
- Lexicon (card game), a 1932 card game from Waddingtons
- A list of acceptable Scrabble words
- The Lexicon (Atlantis), 1985 role-playing game supplement

=== Music ===
- Lexicon (Will Young album), 2019
- Lexicon (Isyana Sarasvati album), 2019
- Lex Icon, a stage name used by Norwegian black metal musician Stian Arnesen (or Nagash)
- "Lexicon", by Neurosis from Enemy of the Sun, 1993

== Buildings ==
- DLR Lexicon, Dún Laoghaire, Ireland
- Lexicon Tower, a tower block in London, England

== Businesses ==
- Lexicon (company), an audio equipment manufacturer
- Lexicon Pharmaceuticals, a biopharmaceutical company

== Computing ==
- Lexicon (program), a text editor and word processor
- Lexicon (typeface), a typeface designed by Bram de Does

== Mathematics ==
- Lexicon (mathematics), a real number that is disjunctive to every base

== See also ==
- Lexical (disambiguation)
- Lexicography, the art of compiling dictionaries or the study of the lexicon
- Lexicology, the scientific study of individual words
- Lexis (disambiguation), a noun with similar meanings
