= Yuri Zytsar =

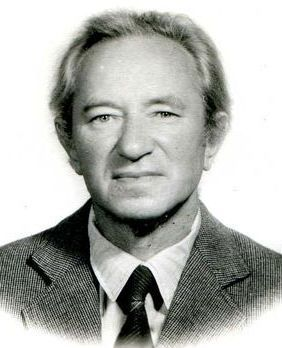

Yuri Vladimirovich Zytsar (also Zitsar, in Russian: Юрий Владимирович Зыцарь; 1928 – 2009) was a Russian-Georgian linguist, specialist in the Basque language. He was one of the founders of both the Soviet as well as the Georgian school of Bascology. He graduated from the Leningrad State University Department of Spanish philology in 1950. After studying in the post-graduate studies, he defended his candidate's dissertation on "The Relation of Native and Romance Elements in the Language of Basques." Zytsar then taught at the universities of Oryol, Kuibyshev and Tbilisi (in the latter since 1976 to 1990). He has been credited with founding the Soviet (Russian) school of Basque studies; in his research, he paid special attention to Basque-Caucasian/Kartvelian language parallels (cf. Basque language#Hypotheses concerning Basque's connections to other languages), publishing dozens of articles on the topic.

== Bibliography ==
- (in Russian) Зыцарь Ю. В. O родстве баскского языка с кавказскими // Вопросы языкознания. 1955. № 5.
- Зыцарь Ю. В. К типологической характеристике эргативной структуры языка басков // Вопросы языкознания. 1977. No. 3.
- Зыцарь Ю. В. О единстве сознания и различиях языков // Вопросы языкознания. 1984. No. 4.
