= Lexical =

Lexical may refer to:

== Linguistics ==
- Lexical corpus or lexis, a complete set of all words in a language
- Lexical item, a basic unit of lexicographical classification
- Lexicon, the vocabulary of a person, language, or branch of knowledge
- Lexical (semiotics) or content word, words referring to things, as opposed to having only grammatical meaning
  - Lexical verb, a member of an open class of verbs that includes all verbs except auxiliary verbs
- Lexical aspect, a characteristic of the meaning of verbs
- Lexical form, the canonical form of a word, under which it appears in dictionaries
- Lexical definition or dictionary definition, the meaning of a term in common usage
- Lexical semantics, a subfield of linguistic semantics that studies how and what the words of a language denote

== Computing ==
- Lexical analysis, the process of converting a sequence of characters into a sequence of tokens
- Lexical Markup Framework, the ISO standard for natural language processing and machine-readable dictionary lexicons
- Lexical scope, a scope in computer programming

== Other uses ==
- Lexical approach, a method of teaching foreign languages
- Lexical hypothesis, a widely used theory in personality psychology

== See also ==
- Lexeme
- Lexicon (disambiguation)
