= Lexis =

Lexis may refer to:

- Lexis (linguistics), a term for a language's lexicon in the abstract, or a synonymous expression
- Lexis (Aristotle), in philosophy
- Lexis diagram, in demography

== Publications ==
- LexisNexis, a database of legal and public records and its publisher
- Lexis Journal in English Lexicology published by OpenEdition.org

== People with the name ==
- Wilhelm Lexis (1837–1914), German statistician, economist, and social scientist

== See also ==
- Lexus, an automobile brand
- Lexi, a Germanic given name
