= North Caucasian languages =

Proposed language family

North Caucasian
- Caucasic
- (controversial)
- Geographic distribution: Caucasus
- Linguistic classification: Proposed language family
- Subdivisions: Northwest Caucasian; Northeast (or Alarodian)

Language codes
- ISO 639-5: ccn
- Glottolog: None
North Caucasian languages
West Caucasian
Circassian (Adyghe and Kabardian)
Abkhaz and Abaza
Ubykh (extinct)
East Caucasian
Nakh
Avar-Andi and Tsezic
Dargin
Lezgic and Khinalug
Lak

The North Caucasian languages, sometimes called simply Caucasic, is a proposed language family consisting of a pair of well established language families spoken in the Caucasus, predominantly in the north, consisting of the Northwest Caucasian family (also called West Caucasian, Circassic, Abkhazo–Circassian, Abkhazo–Adyghe, North Pontic or Pontic) and the Northeast Caucasian family (also called East Caucasian, Nakh–Daghestani, North Caspian or Caspian). There are some 34 to 38 distinct North Caucasian languages.

The Kartvelian languages, including Georgian, Zan and Svan, were once known as South Caucasian. However, they are no longer considered related to the North Caucasian languages and are classified as an independent language family.

Some linguists, notably Sergei Starostin and Sergei Nikolaev, believe that the two groups sprang from a common ancestor about five thousand years BCE. However, this proposal is difficult to evaluate, and remains controversial.

North Caucasian has also been given in an automated computational analysis (ASJP 4) by Müller et al. (2013). However, since the analysis was automatically generated, Müller et al. (2013) does not conclude whether the grouping is due to mutual lexical borrowing or genetic inheritance.

== Internal classification ==
Among the linguists who support the North Caucasian hypothesis, the main split between Northeast Caucasian and Northwest Caucasian is considered uncontroversial. Problems arise when it gets to the internal structure of Northeast Caucasian itself. So far no general agreement has been reached in this respect. The following classification is based on Nikolayev & Starostin (1994):

- North Caucasian
  - Abkhazo-Adyghe (Northwest Caucasian)
  - Nakh–Daghestani (Northeast Caucasian)
    - Nakh
    - Daghestani
      - Avar–Andi–Dido
      - Lak–Dargwa
      - Lezgic

== Comparison of the two phyla ==
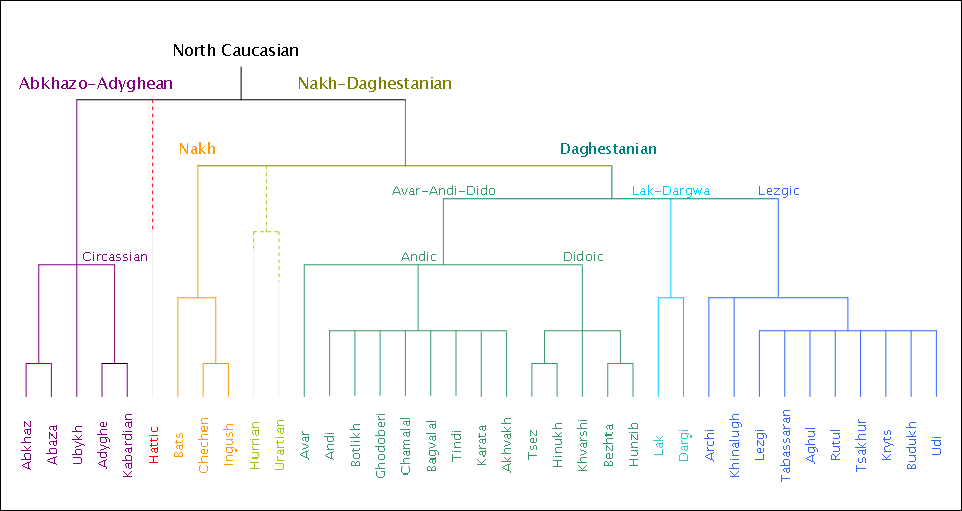
North Caucasian family tree (Nikolayev & Starostin 1994)

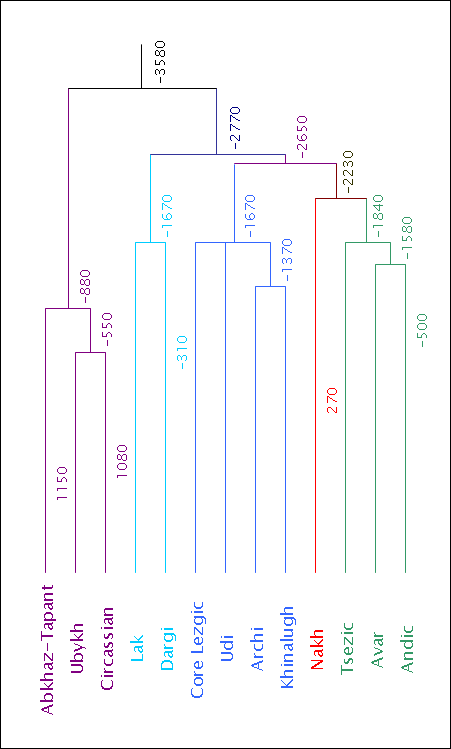
Glottochronological model

The main perceived similarities between the two phyla lie in their phonological systems. However, their grammars are quite different.

=== Main similarities ===
Both phyla are characterised by high levels of phonetic complexity, including the widespread usage of secondary articulation. Ubykh (Northwest) has 84 consonants, and Archi (Northeast) is thought to have 76.

A list of possible cognates has been proposed. However, most of them may be loanwords or simply coincidences, since most of the morphemes in both phyla are quite short (often just a single consonant).

=== Main differences ===
The Northeast Caucasian languages are characterised by great morphological complexity in the noun. For example, in Tsez, a series of locative cases intersect with a series of suffixes designating motion with regard to the location, producing an array of 126 locative suffixes (often – depending on the analysis – described as noun cases).

By contrast, the Northwest Caucasian noun systems are relatively poor in nominal morphology, usually distinguishing just two or three cases. However, they make up for it by possessing a very complex verbal structure: the subject, the direct object, the indirect object, benefactive objects and most local functions are expressed in the verb.

=== Some comparisons ===
Personal pronouns
Person	Northeast Caucasian					PNWC	PNC
Person	PN	PDL	PLK	PAAT	PNEC	PNWC	PNC
1sg	*su-	*du	*zʷə-	dV_{pal}	*zʷə-	*sA	*zoː
2sg	*ħu-	*ħʷə	*ʁʷə-	dV_{lab}/mV	*ʁʷə-	*wA	*u̯oː/*ʁwVː
1pl-i	*way	*-χːa	*χːə-	*iλiː	*łiː- (?)	*šʲə/tːa/χːa	*Läː
1pl-e	*tχu-	*žu	*žʲə	*išiː	*z⇨ʲə-	*šʲə/tːa/χːa	*ži
2pl	*šu-	*-šːa/zu	*žʷə	*bišːdi	*z⇨ʷə-	*sʷV	*źwe

Abbreviations: PN = Proto-Nakh, PDL = Proto-Dargi-Lak, PLK = Proto-Lezgic-Khinalugh, PAAT = Proto-Avar–Andic–Tsezic, PNEC = Proto-Northeast Caucasian, PNWC = Proto-Northwest Caucasian, PNC = Proto-North Caucasian; i = inclusive, e = exclusive

Number	PNEC (S)	PNEC (N)	PNWC (Ch)	PNWC (Co)	PNC (S)
1	*c(h)a	#c(ʕ)V	*za		*cHǝ̆
2	*qʷ’a		*t’qʷ’a	*t’q’o	*q̇Hwǟ
3	*ɬeb (?)		*λ:ə	*(y-)x̂ə/a	*ƛHĕ
4	*əmq(ʷ)’i		*p’λ’a		*hĕmq̇ɨ
5	*x̂ʷə	#(W)=ƛƛi/ƛƛwi	*sx̂ʷə	*(w-/y-)ćx̂ə	*f_ɦä̆
6	*re^{n}ɬə-		*ɬʷə	*(w-)x̂cə	*ʔrǟnƛ_E
7	*u̯ərδ (?)		*bδə		*ʡĕrŁ_ɨ̆
8	*^{m}bərδ		---	*(w-/y-)ɣə/a	*bǖnŁ_e (˜-a)
9	*wərč’		*bğʷʲə	*-ɣə́	*ʔĭlć̣wɨ
10	*wəc’		*bć’ʷə	*(p-/w-)źə́/źá	*ʡĕnc̣Ĕ

Abbreviations: PNEC (S) = Schulze, PNEC (N) = Nichols, PNWC (Ch) = Chirikba, PNWC (Co) = Colarusso, PNC (S) = Starostin & Nikolayev

== Criticism ==
Not all scholars accept the unity of the North Caucasian languages, and some who believe that the two families are related do not accept the methodology used by Nikolayev and Starostin.

== See also ==
- Dené–Caucasian languages
