= Cahiers de l'Institut de Linguistique de Louvain =

Cahiers de l'Institut de linguistique de Louvain
- Discipline: Linguistics
- Language: French

Publication details
- History: 1972-present
- Publisher: Peeters on behalf of UCLouvain

Standard abbreviations
- ISO 4: Cah. Inst. linguist. Louvain

Indexing
- ISSN: 0771-6524 (print); 1783-1407 (web)
- LCCN: 2009257036
- OCLC no.: 66548531

Links
- Journal homepage

The Cahiers de l'Institut de linguistique de Louvain is a peer-reviewed academic journal covering linguistics published by Peeters on behalf of the Université catholique de Louvain. The journal publishes a peer-reviewed supplement series of books, the Série de Pédagogie Linguistique de Louvain.

== Abstracting and indexing ==
The journal is abstracted and indexed in L'Année philologique, Linguistic Bibliography, and the Modern Language Association Database. From 2011 to 2014 it was also covered by Scopus.
