= Lerga =

Town and municipality in Navarre, Spain

Coordinates: 42°34′N 1°30′W

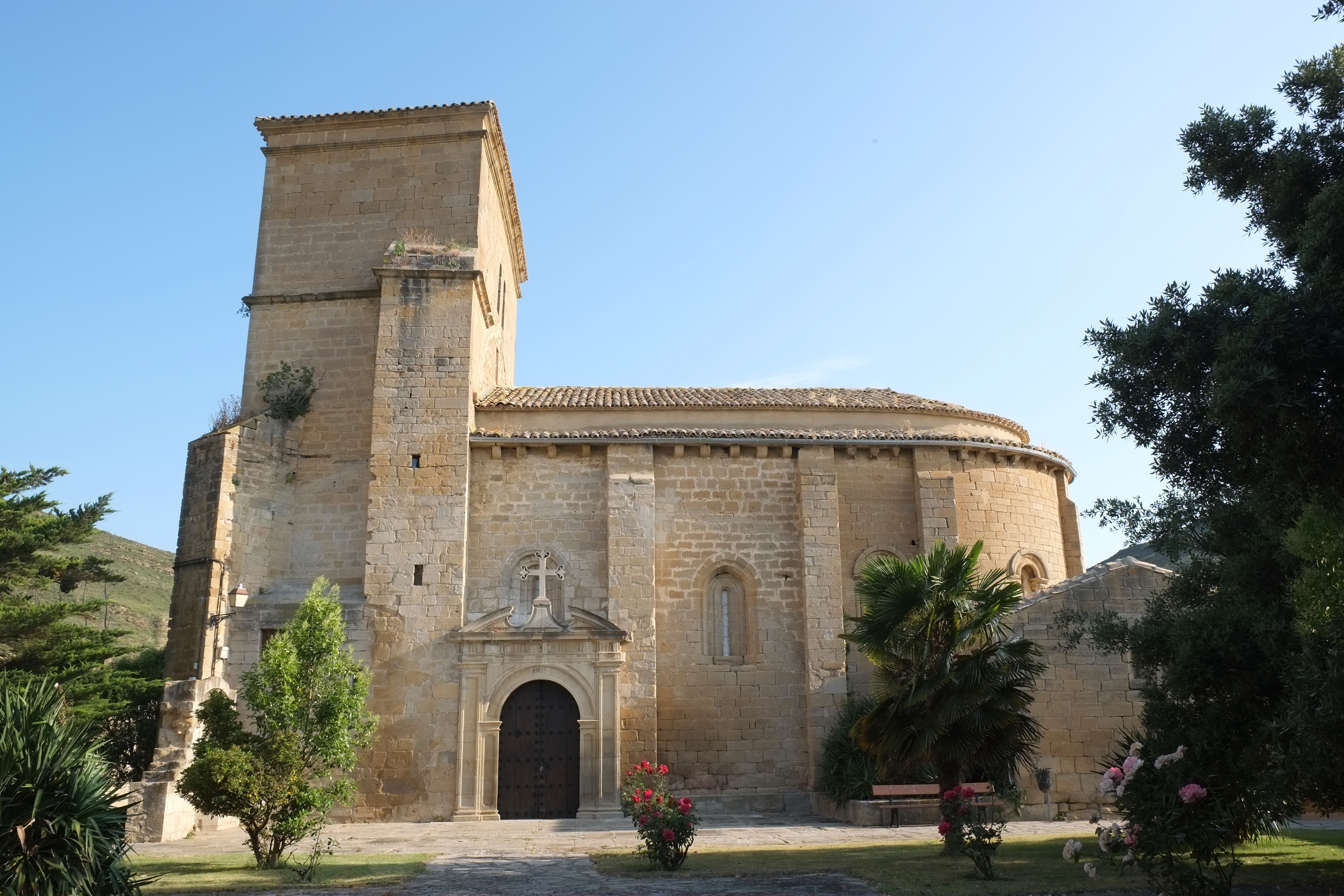
Church of Lerga, Navarre, Spain

Lerga is a town and municipality located in the province and autonomous community of Navarre, northern Spain.

The town is located in a valley surrounded by the Pyrenees Mountains, and is known for its scenery and outdoor recreational opportunities. Lerga is a destination for hikers, mountain bikers, and skiers, as it is located near several ski resorts and hiking trails.
