= Mother Tongue (journal) =

- Discipline: Linguistics
- Language: English

Publication details
- History: 1995–present
- Publisher: Association for the Study of Language in Prehistory (United States)
- Frequency: Annual

Standard abbreviations
- ISO 4: Mother Tongue

Indexing
- ISSN: 1087-0326

Links
- Journal homepage

Mother Tongue is an annual academic journal published by the Association for the Study of Language in Prehistory (ASLIP) that has been published since 1995. Its goal is to encourage international and interdisciplinary information sharing, discussion, and debate among geneticists, paleoanthropologists, archaeologists, and historical linguists on questions relating to the origin of language and ancestral human spoken languages. This includes, but is not limited to, discussion of linguistic macrofamily hypotheses.

== See also ==
- Journal of Language Relationship
