= Claus Schönig =

German Turkologist (1955–2019)

- Born: October 23, 1955; Mainz
- Died: June 23, 2019 (aged 63); Weisenau

Academic background
- Education: University of Mainz
- Thesis: Hilfsverben im Tatarischen (1984)
- Doctoral advisor: Johannes Benzing

Claus Schönig (October 23, 1955 – June 23, 2019) was a German Turkologist. His interests included the historical linguistics of the Turkic languages, Altaistics, and Turko-Mongolic relations.

== Career ==
Schönig was born in the Weisenau district of Mainz in 1955. He studied under Johannes Benzing from 1974 to 1981 at the University of Mainz, where he studied Turkology, Islamic Studies, and Islamic philology. Other faculty who influenced his work at the time were Lars Johanson, Hans-Jürgen Kornrumpf and Ahmed Temir. His 1984 dissertation focused on auxiliary verbs in Tatar. In 1995 he obtained a German Habilitation at the Free University of Berlin with a dissertation on finite predications and text structure in the Baburnama.

Schönig held academic positions at a variety of institutions, including the University of Mainz, Goethe University Frankfurt, the University of Duisburg-Essen, and the University of Giessen. From 1993 to 1996 and from 2001 to 2007 he served as the director of the Orient-Institut Istanbul. From 2007 until 2019, he held the appointed position of Turkology at the Free University of Berlin as the successor of Barbara Kellner-Heinkele. During this time he served as the director of the university's Institute for Turkology.

== Awards and honors ==
- 2006. Member, Academia Europaea
- 2009. Member, Göttingen Academy of Sciences
