= Classification of the Japonic languages =

The classification of the Japonic languages and their external relations is unclear. Linguists traditionally consider the Japonic languages to belong to an independent family; indeed, until the classification of Ryukyuan and eventually Hachijō as separate languages within a Japonic family rather than as dialects of Japanese, Japanese was considered a language isolate.

Among more distant connections, the possibility of a genetic relationship to language families like Austronesian or Kra–Dai is discussed. A relation between Japonic and Koreanic is also considered plausible by some linguists, while others reject this idea. Independent of the question of a Japonic–Koreanic connection, both the Japonic and Koreanic languages are sometimes included in the now largely discredited Altaic family.

== Primary language family ==
The currently most supported view is that the Japonic languages are their own primary language family, consisting of Japanese and the Ryukyuan languages. The Hachijō language is sometimes classified as a third branch of the Japonic language family, but it is otherwise seen to be a very divergent dialect of Eastern Japanese.

It has been suggested that the linguistic homeland of Japonic may be located somewhere in southern, south-eastern, or eastern China prior to a hypothetical migration of proto-Japanese to the Korean Peninsula and the Japanese archipelago. Miyamoto suggests a homeland further north, around modern day Liaoning. Koreanic speakers, then established in Manchuria, expanded southward to the Korean peninsula, displacing Japonic speakers that had been living there and causing the Yayoi migrations into Japan.

It is believed that rice farming spread to Japan from the Yangtze River Delta to the Shandong peninsula, then to the Liaodong peninsula, and finally to the Korean peninsula, from where it was directly introduced to the Japanese archipelago. One hypothesis proposes that Japonic originated in Shandong and was transmitted to Japan by migrating rice farmers following this route, crossing the Bohai sea to Liaodong.

Vovin suggests that Japonic languages were spoken in parts of Korea, especially southern Korea, and were then replaced and assimilated by proto-Korean speakers. Similarly, Whitman (2012) suggests that Japonic is not related to Korean but that Japonic was present on the Korean peninsula during the Mumun pottery period (Yayoi people). According to him, Japonic arrived in the Korean peninsula around 1500 BC and was brought to the Japanese archipelago by the Yayoi at around 950 BC. In this scenario, the language family associated with both Mumun and Yayoi culture is Japonic. Koreanic arrived later from Manchuria to the Korean peninsula at around 300 BC and coexisted with the descendants of the Japonic Mumun cultivators (or assimilated them). Both had influence on each other and a later founder effect diminished the internal variety of both language families.

Most linguists today see the Japonic languages as their own distinct family, not related to Korean, but acknowledge an influence from other language families (and vice versa). Vovin (2015) shows evidence that the early Koreans borrowed words for rice cultivation from Peninsular Japonic. According to him, the middle Korean word psʌr (rice) is loaned from Peninsular Japonic *wasar.

Juha Janhunen (2003) proposed that the Japonic languages originated on the coast of the Shandong Peninsula, and that they originally had similar typological characteristics to the Sinitic languages before they acquired Altaic typological features through contact with the Koreanic languages on the Korean Peninsula.

The linguists Yurayong and Szeto in 2020 analyzed the stages of convergence between Japonic and other languages. They concluded that "our results indirectly speak in favour of a "Paleo-Asiatic" origin of the Japonic languages".

Chaubey and van Driem (2020) propose that the Japonic languages may have already been present in Japan during the early Jōmon period. They suggest that the Japonic languages were already present within the Japanese archipelago and coastal Korea, before the Yayoi period, and can be linked to one of the Jōmon populations of southwestern Japan, rather than the later Yayoi or Kofun period rice-agriculturalists. Japonic-speakers then expanded during the Yayoi period, assimilating the newcomers, adopting rice-agriculture, and fusing mainland Asian technologies with local traditions.

== Possible external relations ==
=== Japonic-Koreanic theory ===
There is disagreement over the protohistorical or historical period during which this expansion occurs, ranging from the Korean Bronze Age period to the Three Kingdoms of Korea period. As there is disagreement among experts when the expansion of Koreanic languages started, there is room for interpretation on the proto-historical and historical extent of the Japonic language presence in the central and southern Korean peninsula.

==== Similarities between Japanese and Koreanic languages ====
===== History =====
Japanese and Korean languages also share some typological similarities, such as an agglutinative morphology, a subject–object–verb (SOV) normal word order, important systems of honorifics (however, the two languages' systems of honorifics are different in form and usage; see Japanese honorifics and Korean honorifics), besides a few lexical resemblances. Factors like these led some historical linguists to suggest a genetic relationship between the two languages.

William George Aston suggested in 1879 in the Journal of the Royal Asiatic Society that Japanese is related to Korean. A relationship between Japanese and Korean was endorsed by the Japanese scholar Shōsaburō Kanazawa in 1910. Other scholars took this position in the twentieth century (Poppe 1965:137). Substantial arguments in favor of a Japanese–Korean relationship were presented by Samuel E. Martin, a leading specialist in Japanese and Korean, in 1966 and in subsequent publications (e.g. Martin 1990). Linguists who advocate this position include John Whitman (1985) and Barbara E. Riley (2004), and Sergei Starostin with his lexicostatistical research, The Altaic Problem and the Origins of the Japanese Language (Moscow, 1991). A Japanese–Korean connection does not necessarily exclude a Japanese–Koguryo or an Altaic relationship.

==== Evidence ====
After filtering out early loanwords, following a procedure suggested in 2010 by Alexander Vovin, Whitman (2012) tries to isolate potential cognates substantially more rigorously than in older literature, including his own works, affirming a relationship between Japonic and Korean, but he stresses that it is relatively distant.

Similarly, a 2016 paper proposing a common lineage between Korean and Japanese claims to trace around 500 core words that show a common origin, including several numerals such as 5 and 10.

Martine Robbeets and Remco Bouckaert from the Max Planck Institute for the Science of Human History used in 2018 for the first time a Bayesian phylogenetic inference analysis about "Transeurasian". Their study resulted in a "high probability" for a "Koreano-Japonic" group, but has not gained acceptance among mainstream linguists.

==== Criticism ====
Many variants of this theory have been criticized for serious methodological flaws, such as rejecting mainstream reconstructions of Chinese and Japanese for less accepted alternatives. Other critics, like Alexander Vovin and Toh Soo Hee, argued that the connections between Japanese and Goguryeo are due to earlier Japonic languages that were present in parts of Korea, and that the Goguryeo language was closer to Sillan, and by extension, Korean. Further studies (2019) deny and criticize a relation between Korean and Japanese. Vovin also argues that the claimed cognates are nothing more than early loanwords from when Japonic was still spoken in southern Korea.

Similarly, Whitman (2011) concludes that the proto-Koreans arrived in the southern part of the Korean Peninsula at around 300 BC and coexist with the native descendants of the Japonic Mumun rice-cultivators (or assimilated them). Both had influence on each other, and a later founder effect diminished the internal variety of both language families, making them more similar. Thus Whitman sees a possible relation between Japonic and Koreanic as unlikely.

The idea of a Japanese–Korean relationship overlaps the extended form of the Altaic hypothesis (see below), but not all scholars who argue for one also argue for the other. For example, Samuel Martin, who was a major advocate of a Japanese–Korean relationship, only provided cautious support to the inclusion of these languages in Altaic, and Talat Tekin, an Altaicist, includes Korean, but not Japanese, in Altaic (Georg et al. 1999:72, 74).

==== Possible connection between Japonic and Koguryoic ====
The Japanese–Koguryoic proposal dates back to Shinmura Izuru's (1916) observation that the attested Goguryeo numerals—3, 5, 7, and 10—are very similar to Japanese. The hypothesis proposes that Japanese is a relative of the extinct languages spoken by the Buyeo-Goguryeo cultures of Korea, southern Manchuria, and Liaodong. The best attested of these is the language of Goguryeo, with the more poorly attested Koguryoic languages of Baekje and Buyeo believed to also be related.

A monograph by Christopher Beckwith (2004) has established about 140 lexical items in the Goguryeo corpus. They mostly occur in place-name collocations, many of which may include grammatical morphemes (including cognates of the Japanese genitive marker no and the Japanese adjective-attributive morpheme -sa) and a few of which may show syntactical relationships. He postulates that the majority of the identified Goguryeo corpus, which includes all of the grammatical morphemes, is related to Japanese. Beckwith was later criticized for using flawed methods to create a relationship between the two languages that results in evidence that isn't accurate.

=== Altaic theory ===
The Altaic language family is a theoretical group composed of, at its core, languages categorized as Turkic, Mongolic, and Tungusic. G.J. Ramstedt's Einführung in die altaische Sprachwissenschaft ('Introduction to Altaic Linguistics') in 1952–1957 included Korean in Altaic. Roy Andrew Miller's Japanese and the Other Altaic Languages (1971) included Japanese in Altaic as well.

The most important recent work that favored the expanded Altaic family (i.e. that Korean and Japanese could both be included under the Altaic language family) is An Etymological Dictionary of the Altaic Languages (3 volumes) by Sergei Starostin, Anna V. Dybo, and Oleg A. Mudrak (2003).

The Altaic proposal has largely been rejected (in both its core form of Turkic, Mongolic, and Tungusic as well as its expanded form that includes Korean and Japanese). The best-known critiques are those by Gerard Clauson (1956) and Gerhard Doerfer (1963, 1988). Current critics include Stefan Georg and Alexander Vovin. Critics including Clauson and Doerfer attribute the similarities in the putative Altaic languages to pre-historic areal contact having occurred between the languages of the expanded group (e.g. between Turkic and Japonic), contact which critics and proponents agree took place to some degree.

Linguists agree today that typological resemblances between Japanese, Korean and Altaic languages cannot be used to prove genetic relatedness of languages, as these features are typologically connected and easily borrowed from one language to the other (e.g. due to geographical proximity with Manchuria). Such factors of typological divergence as Middle Mongolian's exhibition of gender agreement can be used to argue that a genetic relationship with Altaic is unlikely.

==== Transeurasian by Robbeets (2017) ====
According to Robbeets (2017) Proto-Japanese and Proto-Korean originated as a hybrid language around the region of Liaoning in China, incorporating an Austronesian-like language. She suggests that proto-Japanese had an additional influence from Austronesian on the Japanese archipelago.

- Transeurasian
  - Japano‑Koreanic
    - Japonic
    - Koreanic
  - Altaic
    - Tungusic
    - - Mongolic
      - Turkic

She lists the following agricultural vocabulary in proto-Japonic with parallels in Austronesian languages:

mortar

- proto-Japonic *usu '(rice and grain) mortar'
- proto-Austronesian *lusuŋ '(rice) mortar'

rice

- proto-Japonic *kəmai 'dehusked rice'
- proto-Austronesian *Semay 'cooked rice'
- Old Chinese 糜 *C.maj 'rice gruel; destroy, crush'

early ripening crop

- proto-Japonic *wasara ~ *wǝsǝrǝ 'early ripening crop, early ripening rice'
- proto-Austronesian *baCaR 'broomcorn millet (Panicum miliaceum)'
- proto-Koreanic *pʌsal 'hulled variety of grain, rice'

=== Proposals relating Japonic languages to Southeast Asian language families ===
Several linguists have proposed that the Japonic languages are genetically related to the Austronesian languages. Some linguists think it is more plausible that Japanese was instead influenced by Austronesian languages, perhaps by an Austronesian substratum. Those who propose the latter scenario suggest that the Austronesian family once covered most of southern Japan. The phonological similarities of Japanese to the Austronesian languages, and the geographical proximity of Japan to Formosa and the Malay Archipelago have led to the theory that Japanese may be a kind of mixed language, with a Korean (or Altaic) superstratum and an Austronesian substratum.

Similarly Juha Janhunen claims that Austronesians lived in southern Japan, specifically on Shikoku, and that modern Japanese has an "Austronesian layer". The linguist Ann Kumar (2009) believes that some Austronesians migrated to early Japan, possibly an elite group from Java, and created the "Japanese-hierarchical society", and identifies 82 plausible cognates between Austronesian and Japanese. The morphology of Proto-Japanese shows similarities with several languages in South East Asia and southern China. However, Kumar's theory was criticized for archaeological, genetic, and linguistic contradictions.

Itabashi (2011) claims that similarities in morphology, phonology and basic vocabulary point towards "a strong genealogical connection between Japanese and Austronesian".

Paul K. Benedict (1992) suggests a genetic relation between Japanese and the Austro-Tai languages, which include Kra-Dai and Austronesian. He proposes that Kra-Dai and Japanese form a genetic mainland group while Austronesian is the insular group.

Vovin (2014) says that there is typological evidence that Proto-Japonic may have been a monosyllabic, SVO syntax and isolating language; which are features that the Kra-Dai languages also exhibit. He notes that Benedict's idea of a relation between Japanese and Kra-Dai should not be rejected out of hand, but he considers the relationship between them not to be genetic, but rather a contact one. According to him, this contact must be quite old and quite intense, as the borrowed words belong partially to a very basic vocabulary. He further says that this evidence refutes any genetic relations between Japanese and Altaic.

==== Possible Austroasiatic substrate ====
In a discussion of ten reconstructed Proto-Japanese agricultural terms, Vovin (1998) proposes an Austroasiatic origin for three of these terms:

- *(z/h)ina-Ci 'rice (plant)'
- koma-Ci '(hulled) rice'
- pwo 'ear of grain'

According to him early Japanese assimilated Austroasiatic tribes and adopted some vocabulary about rice cultivation. On the other hand, John Whitman (2011) does not support that these words were loanwords into proto-Japonic, but that these words are of Japonic origin and must be rather old.

== Other hypotheses ==
=== Sino-Tibetan hypothesis ===
Another theory was raised by the Japanese linguist Īno Mutsumi (1994). According to him, Japanese is closely related to the Sino-Tibetan languages, especially to the Lolo-Burmese languages of southern China and Southeast-Asia. Because of similar grammar rules (SOV word order, syntax), similar non-loan basic vocabulary and the fact that some Sino-Tibetan languages (including proto-Sino-Tibetan) were non-tonal, he proposed the "Sinitic" origin theory.

=== Proto-Asian hypothesis ===
The "Proto-Asian hypothesis" (Larish 2006) argues for a relation between languages of Southeast and East Asia. Japanese is grouped together with Korean as one group of the descendants of Proto-Asian. The proposal further includes the Austric languages, Kra-Dai, Hmong-Mien and Sino-Tibetan.

=== Dravidian hypothesis ===
A more rarely encountered hypothesis is that Japanese (and Korean) are related to the Dravidian languages. The possibility that Japanese might be related to Dravidian was raised by Robert Caldwell (cf. Caldwell 1875:413) and more recently by Susumu Shiba, Akira Fujiwara, and Susumu Ōno (n.d., 2000). The Japanese professor Tsutomu Kambe claimed to have found more than 500 similar words about agriculture between Tamil and Japanese in 2011.

=== Uralic hypothesis ===
The Japanese linguist Kanehira Joji believes that the Japanese language is related to the Uralic languages. He based his hypothesis on some similar basic words, similar morphology and phonology. According to him early Japanese was influenced by Chinese, Austronesian and Ainu. He refers his theory to the "dual-structure model" of Japanese origin between Jōmon and Yayoi.

=== Ainu hypothesis ===
The Japanese linguist Tatsumine Katayama (2004) found many similar basic words between Ainu and Japanese. Because of a great amount of similar vocabulary, phonology, similar grammar, and geographical and cultural connections, he and Takeshi Umehara suggested that Japanese was closely related to the Ainu languages, and was influenced by other languages, especially Chinese and Korean.

A linguistic analysis in 2015 proposed that the Japonic languages were related to the Ainu languages and to the Austroasiatic languages. However, similarities between Ainu and Japonic are also due to extensive past contact. Analytic grammatical constructions acquired or transformed in Ainu were likely due to contact with Japanese and the Japonic languages, which had heavy influence on the Ainu languages with a large number of loanwords borrowed into the Ainu languages, and to a smaller extent, vice versa.

Today, a relation between Ainu and Japanese (or Austroasiatic) is not supported and Ainu remains a language isolate.

== See also ==
- Linguistic reconstruction
- Comparison of Japanese and Korean
- Eurasiatic languages
- Nostratic languages

== Bibliography ==
=== Works cited ===
- Aston, William George (1879). "A comparative study of the Japanese and Korean languages". Journal of the Royal Asiatic Society of Britain and Ireland. New Series. 11: 317–364. doi:10.1017/s0035869x00017305. S2CID 161676140.
- Beckwith, Christopher I. 2004. Koguryo: The Language of Japan's Continental Relatives: An Introduction to the Historical-Comparative Study of the Japanese-Koguryoic Languages. Leiden: Brill.
- Beckwith, Christopher I. (2005). "The ethnolinguistic history of the early Korean peninsula region: Japanese-Koguryŏic and other languages in the Koguryŏ, Paekche, and Silla kingdoms" (PDF). Journal of Inner and East Asian Studies. 2 (2): 34–64. Archived from the original (PDF) on 2009-02-26.
- Beckwith, Christopher I. (2006). "Methodological observations on some recent studies of the early ethnolinguistic history of Korea and vicinity". Altai Hakpo. 16: 199–234.
- Benedict, Paul K. (1990). Japanese/Austro-Tai. Ann Arbor: Karoma.
- Caldwell, Robert. 1875. A Comparative Grammar of the Dravidian or South-Indian Family of Languages, second edition. London: Trübner.
- Georg, Stefan, Peter A. Michalove, Alexis Manaster Ramer, and Paul J. Sidwell. 1999. "Telling general linguists about Altaic." Journal of Linguistics 35, 65–98. Cambridge: Cambridge University Press.
- Greenberg, Joseph H. 2000–2002. Indo-European and Its Closest Relatives: The Eurasiatic Language Family, 2 volumes. Stanford: Stanford University Press.
- Greenberg, Joseph H. 2005. Genetic Linguistics: Essays on Theory and Method, edited by William Croft. Oxford: Oxford University Press.
- Kanazawa, Shōsaburō. 1910. The Common Origin of the Japanese and Korean Languages. Tokyo: Sanseidō.
- Lewin, Bruno (1976). "Japanese and Korean: The Problems and History of a Linguistic Comparison". Journal of Japanese Studies. 2 (2): 389–412. doi:10.2307/132059. JSTOR 132059.
- Martin, Samuel E. (1966). "Lexical evidence relating Korean to Japanese". Language. 12 (2): 185–251. doi:10.2307/411687. JSTOR 411687.
- Martin, Samuel E. (1990). "Morphological clues to the relationships of Japanese and Korean". In Philip Baldi (ed.). Linguistic Change and Reconstruction Methodology. Berlin: de Gruyter.
- Matsumoto, Katsumi (1975). "Kodai nihongoboin soshikikõ: naiteki saiken no kokoromi". Bulletin of the Faculty of Law and Letters. 22. Kanazawa University: 83–152.
- Miller, Roy Andrew (1967). The Japanese language. Chicago: University of Chicago Press.
- Miller, Roy Andrew (1971). Japanese and the Other Altaic Languages. Chicago: University of Chicago Press.
- Murayama, Shichiro (1976). "The Malayo-Polynesian Component in the Japanese Language". Journal of Japanese Studies. 2 (2): 413–436. doi:10.2307/132060. JSTOR 132060.
- Ōno, Susumu. n.d. "The genealogy of the Japanese language: Tamil and Japanese."
- Ōno, Susumu. 2000. 日本語の形成. 岩波書店. ISBN 4-00-001758-6.
- Poppe, Nicholas. 1965. Introduction to Altaic Linguistics. Wiesbaden: Otto Harrassowitz.
- Riley, Barbara E. 2003. Aspects of the Genetic Relationship of the Korean and Japanese Languages. PhD thesis, University of Hawaii.
- Shibatani, Masayoshi. 1990. The languages of Japan. Cambridge: Cambridge UP.
- Starostin, Sergei A. 1991. Altajskaja problema i proisxoždenie japonskogo jazyka, 'The Altaic Problem and the Origin of the Japanese Language'. Moscow: Nauka.
- Starostin, Sergei A., Anna V. Dybo, and Oleg A. Mudrak. 2003. Etymological Dictionary of the Altaic Languages, 3 volumes. Leiden: Brill. (Also: database version.)
- Trombetti, Alfredo. 1922–1923. Elementi di glottologia, 2 volumes. Bologna: Nicola Zanichelli.
- Vovin, Alexander. 2003. 日本語系統論の現在：これからどこへ 'The genetic relationship of the Japanese language: Where do we go from here?'. In 日本語系統論の現在 'Perspectives on the Origins of the Japanese Language', edited by Alexander Vovin and Toshiki Osada. Kyoto: International Center for Japanese Studies. ISSN 1346-6585.
- Whitman, John Bradford. 1985. The Phonological Basis for the Comparison of Japanese and Korean. PhD thesis, Harvard University.

=== Further reading ===
- Francis-Ratte, Alexander Takenobu. 2016. Proto-Korean-Japanese: A New Reconstruction of the Common Origin of the Japanese and Korean Languages . PhD dissertation: Ohio State University.
- Janhunen, Juha (2003). "A Framework for the Study of Japanese Language Origins". In Vovin, Alexander; Osada, Toshiki (eds.). Nihongo keitōron no ima 日本語系統論の現在 [Perspectives on the Origins of the Japanese Language]. International Research Center for Japanese Studies. pp. 477–490. ISBN 978-4-9015-5817-4. Archived from the original (PDF) on 2018-08-06.
- Katsumi, Matsumoto. 2007. 世界言語のなかの日本語 Sekaigengo no nakano Nihongo, 'Japanese in the World's Languages'. Tokyo: Sanseido.
- Martin, Samuel E. 1968. "Grammatical elements relating Korean to Japanese." In Proceedings of the Eighth Congress of Anthropological and Ethnological Sciences B.9, 405-407.
- Martin, Samuel E. 1975. "Problems in establishing the prehistoric relationships of Korean and Japanese." In Proceedings, International Symposium Commemorating the 30th Anniversary of Korean Liberation. Seoul: National Academy of Sciences.
- Martin, Samuel E. 1991. "Recent research on the relationships of Japanese and Korean." In Sprung from Some Common Source: Investigations into the Prehistory of Languages, edited by Sydney M. Lamb and E. Douglas Mitchell. Stanford: Stanford University Press.
- Martin, Samuel E. 1996. Consonant Lenition in Korean and the Macro-Altaic Question. Honolulu: University of Hawaii Press.
- Miller, Roy Andrew. 1980. Origins of the Japanese Language: Lectures in Japan during the Academic Year 1977–78. Seattle: University of Washington Press.
- Miller, Roy Andrew. 1996. Languages and History: Japanese, Korean and Altaic. Oslo: Institute for Comparative Research in Human Culture.
- Robbeets, Martine. 2004a. "Belief or argument? The classification of the Japanese language." Eurasia Newsletter 8. Graduate School of Letters, Kyoto University.
- Robbeets, Martine. 2004b. "Swadesh 100 on Japanese, Korean and Altaic." Tokyo University Linguistic Papers, TULIP 23, 99–118.
- Robbeets, Martine. 2005. Is Japanese related to Korean, Tungusic, Mongolic and Turkic? Wiesbaden: Otto Harrassowitz.
- Robbeets, Martine (2007). "How the actional suffix chain connects Japanese to Altaic". Turkic Languages. 11 (1): 3–58.
- Unger, J. Marshall (2014). "No rush to judgment: the case against Japanese as an isolate". NINJAL Project Review. 4 (3): 211–230. doi:10.15084/00000755.
