= Altaic languages =

Convergence zone and proposed language family

Altaic
- (Widely rejected as a genealogical proposal widely considered a sprachbund but maintained by a minority)
- Geographic distribution: Northern, Eastern, and Central Asia, Eastern and Southeastern Europe, Caucasus
- Languages: Turkic; Mongolic; Tungusic
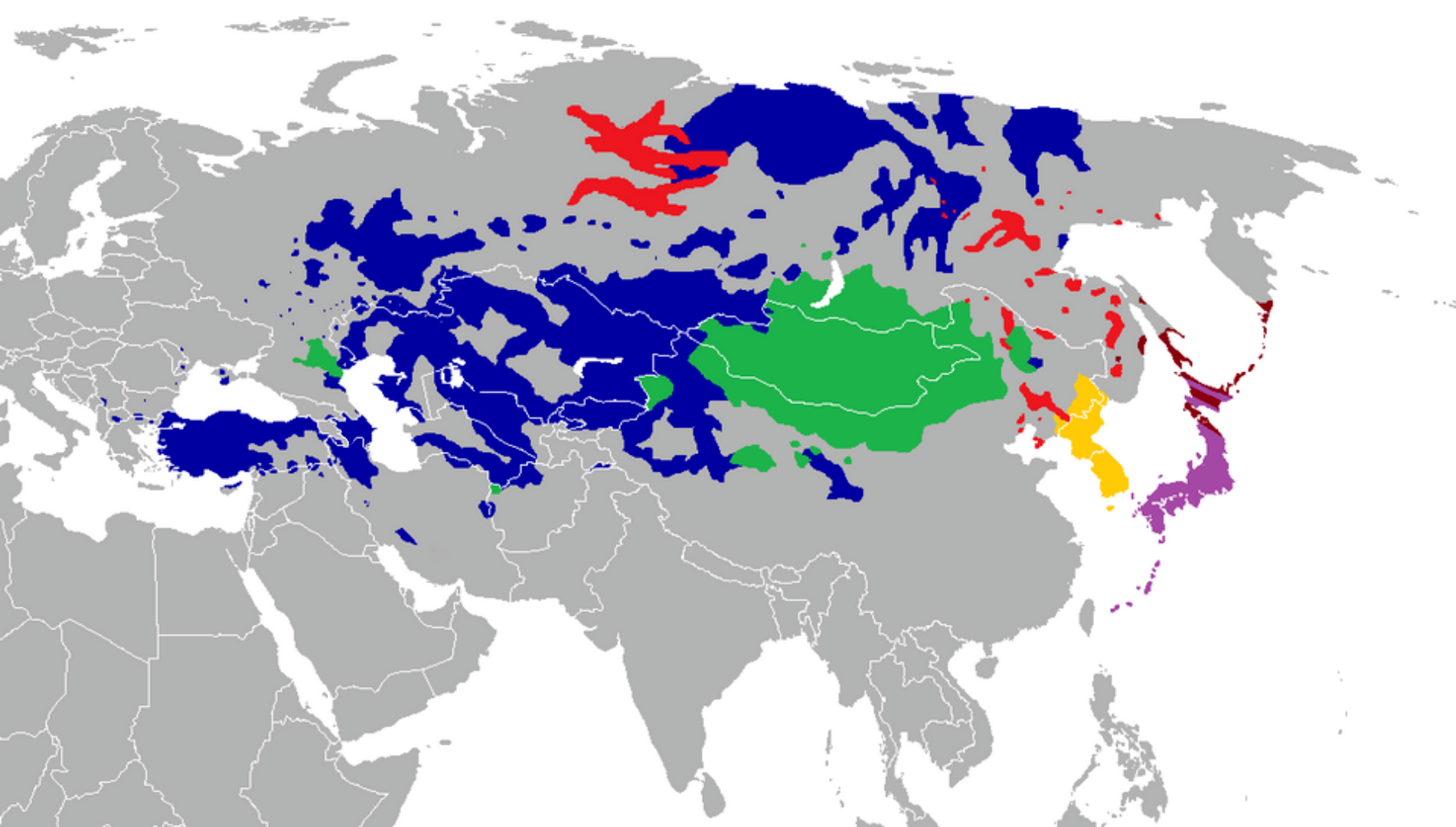
- Turkic languages Mongolic languages Tungusic languages Koreanic languages (sometimes included) Japonic languages (sometimes included) Ainu languages (sometimes included)
- Notes: Initially proposed as a major language family, the Altaic grouping is now considered by the majority of linguists as obsolete, with its similarities attributed to areal convergence typical of sprachbund found across unrelated language families worldwide. Nevertheless, a minority of linguists is still in favour of the language family classification.

The Altaic languages (/æl.ˈteɪ.ɪk/, al-TAY-ik) or Altaic sprachbund are a sprachbund comprising the Turkic, Mongolic and Tungusic language families. The grouping was previously proposed as a language family, a theory which found support in the 20th century but is now rejected by many linguists, who have concluded the similarities among Turkic, Mongolic, and Tungusic languages are better explained by areal convergence rather than a shared genetic lineage. There is still, however, a significant faction of academics advocating for the language label, as the debate is still running.

These languages share agglutinative morphology, head-final word order, and some vocabulary. The once-popular theory attributing these similarities to a common ancestry has been questioned by most comparative linguists in favor of language contact, although it continues to be supported by a smaller, yet stable scholarly minority. Like the Uralic language family, which is named after the Ural Mountains, the group is named after the Altai mountain range in the center of Asia.

The core grouping of Turkic, Mongolic, and Tungusic languages is sometimes referred to as "Micro-Altaic" or "Core-Altaic," while an expanded grouping that includes Koreanic and Japonic is labeled "Macro-Altaic". A group of scholars divided the Macro-Altaic family into two related branches: Altaic family (Turkic, Mongolic, and Tungusic) and Japano-Koreanic family (Japonic and Koreanic) which together are referred to as Transeurasian language family. Today, "Macro-Altaic", together with the idea that Japonic, Koreanic, or Ainu may be part of a genetically coherent family, has been firmly rejected, even by proponents of the Altaic theory. Consequently, the term "Altaic", (whether referred to as a language group or a sprachbund), now encompasses only the Turkic, Mongolic, and Tungusic languages.

The Altaic family was first proposed in the 18th century. It was widely accepted until the 1960s and is still listed in many encyclopedias and handbooks, and references to Altaic as a language family continue to percolate to modern sources through these older sources. Since the 1950s, most comparative linguists have rejected the proposal, after supposed cognates were found not to be valid, hypothesized sound shifts were not found, and Turkic and Mongolic languages were found to have been converging rather than diverging over the centuries. The relationship between the Altaic languages is now generally accepted to be the result of a sprachbund rather than common ancestry, with the languages showing influence from prolonged contact.

Altaic has maintained a limited degree of scholarly support, in contrast to some other early macrofamily proposals. Continued research on Altaic is still being undertaken by a core group of academic linguists, but their research has not found wider support. In particular it has support from the Institute of Linguistics of the Russian Academy of Sciences and remains influential as a substratum of Turanism, where a hypothetical common linguistic ancestor has been used in part as a basis for a multiethnic nationalist movement.

== Earliest attestations ==
The earliest attested expressions in Proto-Turkic are recorded in various Chinese sources. Anna Dybo identifies in Shizi (330 BC) and the Book of Han (AD 111) several dozen Proto-Turkic exotisms in Chinese Han transcriptions. Lanhai Wei and Hui Li reconstruct the name of the Xiōngnú ruling house as PT *Alayundluğ /alajuntˈluɣ/ 'piebald horse clan.'

The earliest known texts in a Turkic language are the Orkhon inscriptions, 720–735 AD. They were deciphered in 1893 by the Danish linguist Vilhelm Thomsen in a scholarly race with his rival, the German–Russian linguist Wilhelm Radloff. However, Radloff was the first to publish the inscriptions.

The first Tungusic language to be attested is Jurchen, the language of the ancestors of the Manchus. A writing system for it was devised in 1119 AD and an inscription using this system is known from 1185 (see List of Jurchen inscriptions).

The earliest Mongolic language of which we have written evidence is known as Middle Mongol. It is first attested by an inscription dated to 1224 or 1225 AD, the Stele of Yisüngge, and by the Secret History of the Mongols, written in 1228 (see Mongolic languages). The earliest Para-Mongolic text is the Memorial for Yelü Yanning, written in the Khitan large script and dated to 986 AD. However, the Inscription of Hüis Tolgoi, discovered in 1975 and analysed as being in an early form of Mongolic, has been dated to 604–620 AD. The Bugut inscription dates back to 584 AD.

Japanese is first attested in the form of names contained in a few short inscriptions in Classical Chinese from the 5th century AD, such as found on the Inariyama Sword. The first substantial text in Japanese, however, is the Kojiki, which dates from 712 AD. It is followed by the Nihon shoki, completed in 720, and then by the Man'yōshū, which dates from c. 771–785, but includes material that is from about 400 years earlier.

The most important text for the study of early Korean is the Hyangga, a collection of 25 poems, of which some go back to the Three Kingdoms period (57 BC–668 AD), but are preserved in an orthography that only goes back to the 9th century AD. Korean is copiously attested from the mid-15th century on in the phonetically precise Hangul system of writing.

== History of the Altaic family concept ==
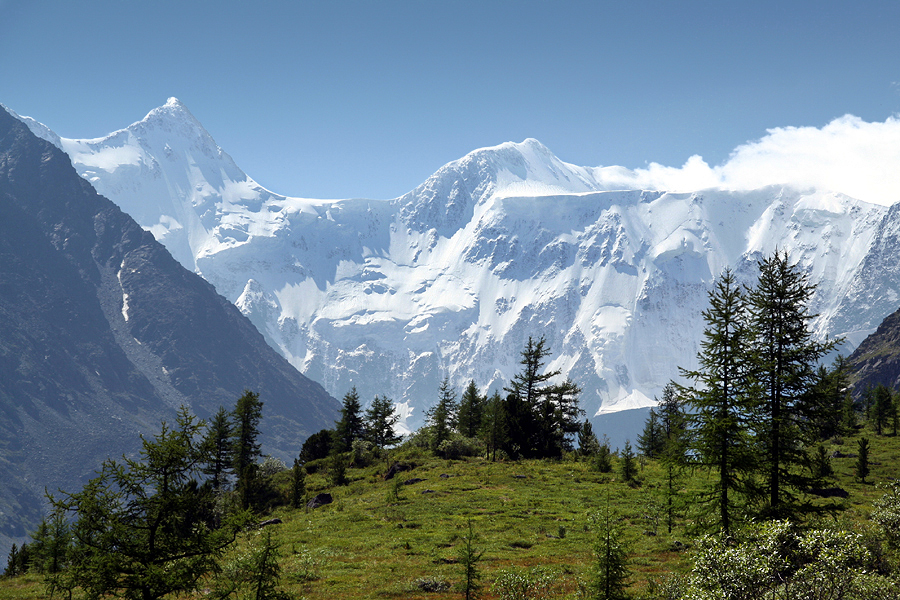
The Altai Mountains in East-Central Asia give their name to the proposed language family.

=== Origins ===
The earliest known reference to a unified language group of Turkic, Mongolic, and Tungusic languages is from the 1692 work of Nicolaes Witsen, which may be based on a 1661 work of Abu al-Ghazi Bahadur, Genealogy of the Turkmens.

A proposed grouping of the Turkic, Mongolic, and Tungusic languages was published in 1730 by Philip Johan von Strahlenberg, a Swedish officer who traveled in the eastern Russian Empire while a prisoner of war after the Great Northern War. However, he may not have intended to imply a closer relationship among those languages. Later proposals to include the Korean and Japanese languages into a "Macro-Altaic" family have always been controversial. The original proposal was sometimes called "Micro-Altaic" by retronymy. According to Blench & Dendo (2008), most proponents of Altaic continue to support the inclusion of Korean, but fewer do for Japanese. Some proposals also included Ainuic but this is not widely accepted even among Altaicists themselves. A common ancestral Proto-Altaic language for the "Macro" family has been tentatively reconstructed by Sergei Starostin and others.

Micro-Altaic includes about 66 living languages, to which Macro-Altaic would add Korean, Jeju, Japanese, and the Ryukyuan languages, for a total of about 74 (depending on what is considered a language and what is considered a dialect). These numbers do not include earlier states of languages, such as Middle Mongol, Old Korean, or Old Japanese.

=== Uralo-Altaic hypothesis ===
In 1844, the Finnish philologist Matthias Castrén proposed a broader grouping which later came to be called the Ural–Altaic family, which included Turkic, Mongolian, and Manchu-Tungus (=Tungusic) as an "Altaic" branch, and also the Finno-Ugric and Samoyedic languages as the "Uralic" branch (though Castrén himself used the terms "Tataric" and "Chudic"). The name "Altaic" referred to the Altai Mountains in East-Central Asia, which are approximately the center of the geographic range of the three main families. The name "Uralic" referred to the Ural Mountains.

While the Ural-Altaic family hypothesis can still be found in some encyclopedias, atlases, and similar general references, since the 1960s it has been heavily criticized. Even linguists who accept the basic Altaic family, such as Sergei Starostin, completely discard the inclusion of the "Uralic" branch.

The term continues to be used for the central Eurasian typological, grammatical and lexical convergence zone. Indeed, "Ural-Altaic" may be preferable to "Altaic" in this sense. For example, Juha Janhunen states that "speaking of 'Altaic' instead of 'Ural-Altaic' is a misconception, for there are no areal or typological features that are specific to 'Altaic' without Uralic."

=== Korean and Japanese languages ===
In 1857, the Austrian scholar Anton Boller suggested adding Japanese to the Ural–Altaic family.

In the 1920s, G.J. Ramstedt and E.D. Polivanov advocated the inclusion of Korean. Decades later, in his 1952 book, Ramstedt rejected the Ural–Altaic hypothesis but again included Korean in Altaic, an inclusion followed by most leading Altaicists (supporters of the theory) to date. His book contained the first comprehensive attempt to identify regular correspondences among the sound systems within the Altaic language families.

In 1960, Nicholas Poppe published what was in effect a heavily revised version of Ramstedt's volume on phonology that has since set the standard in Altaic studies. Poppe considered the issue of the relationship of Korean to Turkic-Mongolic-Tungusic not settled. In his view, there were three possibilities: (1) Korean did not belong with the other three genealogically, but had been influenced by an Altaic substratum; (2) Korean was related to the other three at the same level they were related to each other; (3) Korean had split off from the other three before they underwent a series of characteristic changes.

Roy Andrew Miller's 1971 book Japanese and the Other Altaic Languages convinced most Altaicists that Japanese also belonged to Altaic. Since then, the "Macro-Altaic" has been generally assumed to include Turkic, Mongolic, Tungusic, Korean, and Japanese.

In 1990, Unger, emphasizing the need to establish language relationships rigorously "from the bottom up," advocated comparing Tungusic with the common ancestor of Korean and Japanese before seeking connections with Turkic or Mongolic.

However, many linguists dispute the alleged affinities of Korean and Japanese to the other three groups. Some authors instead tried to connect Japanese to the Austronesian languages.

In 2017, Martine Robbeets proposed that Japanese (and possibly Korean) originated as a hybrid language. She proposed that the ancestral home of the Turkic, Mongolic, and Tungusic languages was somewhere in northwestern Manchuria. A group of those proto-Altaic ("Transeurasian") speakers would have migrated south into the modern Liaoning province, where they would have been mostly assimilated by an agricultural community with an Austronesian-like language. The fusion of the two languages would have resulted in proto-Japanese and proto-Korean. In 2022, Zheng Tiang et al. criticized Robbeets' view, stating that it suffers from fundamental problems, several contradictions, as well as non-replicable and invalid data. They found no empirical support for either a "Transeurasian" language family, nor for associating the five different language families with the spread of Neolithic farmers from the West Liao River region.

Yurayong and Szeto (2020), in a typological study that does not directly evaluate the validity of the Altaic hypothesis, discuss for Koreanic and Japonic the stages of convergence to the Altaic typological model and subsequent divergence from that model, which resulted in the present typological similarity between Koreanic and Japonic. They state that both are "still so different from the Core Altaic languages that we can even speak of an independent Japanese-Korean type of grammar. Given also that there is neither a strong proof of common Proto-Altaic lexical items nor solid regular sound correspondences but, rather, only lexical and structural borrowings between languages of the Altaic typology, our results indirectly speak in favour of a “Paleo-Asiatic” origin of the Japonic and Koreanic languages."

In 2023, Juha Janhunen affirmed that Japonic and Koreanic are completely unrelated to "Micro-Altaic":

An important fault line within the Altaic complex separates Koreanic and Japonic from Turkic, Mongolic, and Tungusic. Not only are Koreanic and Japonic in some respects less "Altaic" typologically, but, in spite of attempts to show the contrary, they also lack any significant number of material similarities with the three Micro-Altaic families, or with each other.

According to Janhunen, Pre-Proto-Japonic was closer to Sinitic, rather than to anything Altaic-related.

=== The Ainu language ===
In 1962, John C. Street proposed an alternative classification, with Turkic-Mongolic-Tungusic in one grouping and Korean-Japanese-Ainu in another, joined in what he designated as the "North Asiatic" family. The inclusion of Ainu was adopted also by James Patrie in 1982.

The Turkic-Mongolic-Tungusic and Korean-Japanese-Ainu groupings were also posited in 2000–2002 by Joseph Greenberg. However, he treated them as independent members of a larger family, which he termed Eurasiatic.

The inclusion of Ainu is not widely accepted by Altaicists. In fact, no convincing genealogical relationship between Ainu and any other language family has been demonstrated, and it is generally regarded as a language isolate.

=== Early criticism and rejection ===
Starting in the late 1950s, some linguists became increasingly critical of even the minimal Altaic family hypothesis, disputing the alleged evidence of genetic connection between Turkic, Mongolic and Tungusic languages.

Among the earlier critics were Gerard Clauson (1956), Gerhard Doerfer (1963), and Alexander Shcherbak. They claimed that the words and features shared by Turkic, Mongolic, and Tungusic languages were for the most part borrowings and that the rest could be attributed to chance resemblances. In 1988, Doerfer again rejected all the genetic claims over these major groups.

=== Modern controversy ===
A major continuing supporter of the Altaic hypothesis has been Sergei Starostin, who published a comparative lexical analysis of the Altaic languages in 1991. He concluded that the analysis supported the Altaic grouping, although it was "older than most other language families in Eurasia, such as Indo-European or Finno-Ugric, and this is the reason why the modern Altaic languages preserve few common elements".

In 1991 and again in 1996, Roy Miller defended the Altaic hypothesis and claimed that the criticisms of Clauson and Doerfer apply exclusively to the lexical correspondences, whereas the most pressing evidence for the theory is the similarities in verbal morphology.

In 2003, Claus Schönig published a critical overview of the history of the Altaic hypothesis up to that time, siding with the earlier criticisms of Clauson, Doerfer, and Shcherbak.

In 2003, Starostin, Anna Dybo and Oleg Mudrak published the Etymological Dictionary of the Altaic Languages, which expanded the 1991 lexical lists and added other phonological and grammatical arguments.

Starostin's book was criticized by Stefan Georg in 2004 and 2005, and by Alexander Vovin in 2005.

Other defenses of the theory, in response to the criticisms of Georg and Vovin, were published by Starostin in 2005, Blažek in 2006, Robbeets in 2007, and Dybo and G. Starostin in 2008.

In 2010, Lars Johanson echoed Miller's 1996 rebuttal to the critics, and called for a muting of the polemic.

=== List of supporters and critics of the Altaic hypothesis ===
The list below comprises linguists who have worked specifically on the Altaic problem since the publication of the first volume of Ramstedt's Einführung in 1952. The dates given are those of works concerning Altaic. For supporters of the theory, the version of Altaic they favor is given at the end of the entry, if other than the prevailing one of Turkic–Mongolic–Tungusic–Korean–Japanese.

==== Major supporters ====
- Pentti Aalto (1955). Turkic–Mongolic–Tungusic–Korean.
- Anna V. Dybo (S. Starostin et al. 2003, A. Dybo and G. Starostin 2008).
- Frederik Kortlandt (2010).
- Karl H. Menges (1975). Common ancestor of Korean, Japanese and traditional Altaic dated back to the 7th or 8th millennium BC (1975: 125).
- Roy Andrew Miller (1971, 1980, 1986, 1996). Supported the inclusion of Korean and Japanese.
- Oleg A. Mudrak (S. Starostin et al. 2003).
- Nicholas Poppe (1965). Turkic–Mongolic–Tungusic and perhaps Korean.
- Alexis Manaster Ramer.
- Peter Benjamin Golden
- Martine Robbeets (2004, 2005, 2007, 2008, 2015, 2021) (in the form of "Transeurasian").
- G. J. Ramstedt (1952–1957). Turkic–Mongolic–Tungusic–Korean.
- Georgiy Starostin (A. Dybo and G. Starostin 2008).
- Sergei Starostin (1991, S. Starostin et al. 2003).
- John C. Street (1962). Turkic–Mongolic–Tungusic and Korean–Japanese–Ainu, grouped as "North Asiatic".
- Talât Tekin (1994). Turkic–Mongolic–Tungusic–Korean.
- James Patrie (1982)
- Joseph Greenberg (2000–2002).

==== Major critics ====
- Gerard Clauson (1956, 1959, 1962)
- Gerhard Doerfer (1963, 1966, 1967, 1968, 1972, 1973, 1974, 1975, 1981, 1985, 1988, 1993)
- Susumu Ōno (1970, 2000)
- Juha Janhunen (1992, 1995) (tentative support of Mongolic-Tungusic)
- Claus Schönig (2003)
- Stefan Georg (2004, 2005)
- Alexander Vovin (2005, 2010, 2017) - Formerly an advocate of Altaic (1994, 1995, 1997, 1999, 2000, 2001), later a critic
- Alexander Shcherbak
- Alexander B. M. Stiven (2008, 2010)

==== Advocates of alternative hypotheses ====
- J. Marshall Unger (1990). Tungusic–Korean–Japanese ("Macro-Tungusic"), with Turkic and Mongolic as separate language families.
- Lars Johanson (2010). Agnostic, proponent of a "Transeurasian" verbal morphology not necessarily genealogically linked.

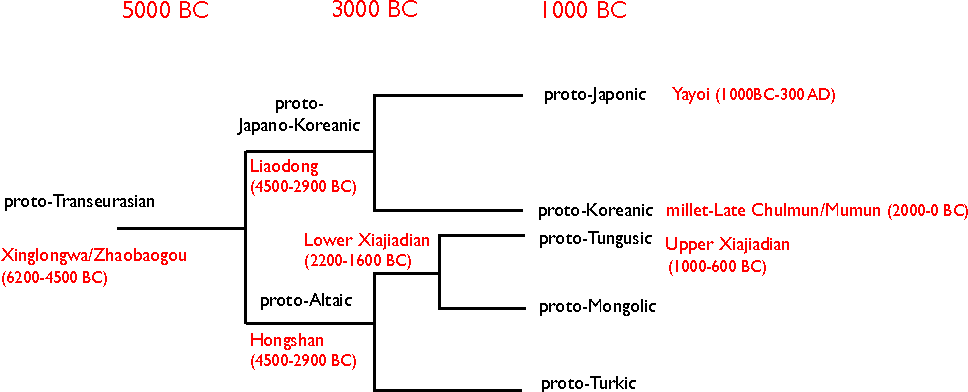
Distribution of the Trans-Eurasian (Macro-Altaic) Language Family

=== Terminologic alternatives ===
In Robbeets and Johanson (2010), a proposal was made to replace the "Altaic" family with a broader "Transeurasian" superfamily. In this classification, "Altaic" remained as a subgroup consisting of the Turkic, Mongolic, and Tungusic languages, while the "Transeurasian" superfamily also included an additional group called "Japano-Koreanic," which comprised the Japonic and Koreanic language families.

Robbeets and Johanson gave as their reasoning for the new term:

- to avoid confusion between the different uses of Altaic as to which group of languages is included;
- to reduce the counterproductive polarization between "Pro-Altaists" and "Anti-Altaists";
- to broaden the applicability of the term because the suffix -ic implies affinity while -an leaves room for an areal hypothesis; and
- to eliminate the reference to the Altai mountains as a potential homeland.

The term "Micro-Altaic" or "Core-Altaic" is widely used for the grouping of Turkic, Mongolic, and Tungusic languages, while Macro-Altaic refers to a broader grouping that also includes Koreanic and Japonic.

== Arguments ==
=== For the Altaic grouping ===
==== Phonological and grammatical features ====
The original arguments for grouping the "micro-Altaic" languages within a Uralo-Altaic family were based on such shared features as vowel harmony and agglutination.

According to Roy Miller, the most pressing evidence for the theory is the similarities in verbal morphology.

The Etymological Dictionary by Starostin and others (2003) proposes a set of sound change laws that would explain the evolution from Proto-Altaic to the descendant languages. For example, although most of today's Altaic languages have vowel harmony, Proto-Altaic as reconstructed by them lacked it; instead, various vowel assimilations between the first and second syllables of words occurred in Turkic, Mongolic, Tungusic, Korean, and Japonic. They also included a number of grammatical correspondences between the languages.

==== Shared lexicon ====
Starostin claimed in 1991 that the members of the proposed Altaic group shared about 15–20% of apparent cognates within a 110-word Swadesh-Yakhontov list; in particular, Turkic–Mongolic 20%, Turkic–Tungusic 18%, Turkic–Korean 17%, Mongolic–Tungusic 22%, Mongolic–Korean 16%, and Tungusic–Korean 21%. The 2003 Etymological Dictionary includes a list of 2,800 proposed cognate sets, as well as a few important changes to the reconstruction of Proto-Altaic. The authors tried hard to distinguish loans between Turkic and Mongolic and between Mongolic and Tungusic from cognates; and suggest words that occur in Turkic and Tungusic but not in Mongolic. All other combinations between the five branches also occur in the book. It lists 144 items of shared basic vocabulary, including words for such items as 'eye', 'ear', 'neck', 'bone', 'blood', 'water', 'stone', 'sun', and 'two'.

Robbeets and Bouckaert (2018) use Bayesian phylolinguistic methods to argue for the coherence of the "narrow" Altaic languages (Turkic, Mongolic, and Tungusic) together with Japonic and Koreanic, which they refer to as the Transeurasian languages. Their results include the following phylogenetic tree:

- Transeurasian
  - Japano‑Koreanic
    - Japonic
    - Koreanic
  - Altaic
    - Tungusic
    - - Mongolic
      - Turkic

Martine Robbeets et al. (2021) argues that early Transeurasian speakers were originally agriculturalists in Northeastern Asia, only becoming pastoralists later on.

The analysis conducted by Kassian et al. (2021) on a 110-item word list, specifically developed for each of the languages — Proto-Turkic, Proto-Mongolic, Proto-Tungusic, Middle Korean and Proto-Japonic — indicated partial support for the Altaic macrofamily, with Korean seemingly excluded. While acknowledging that prehistoric contacts are a plausible alternative explanation for the positive results, they deem such a scenario less likely for the lexical matches between Turkic and Japonic languages, which are better explained by genealogical relationship because of the substantial geographical distances involved.

=== Against the grouping ===
==== Weakness of lexical and typological data ====
According to G. Clauson (1956), G. Doerfer (1963), and A. Shcherbak (1963), many of the typological features of the supposed Altaic languages, particularly agglutinative strongly suffixing morphology and subject–object–verb (SOV) word order, often occur together in languages.

Those critics also argued that the words and features shared by Turkic, Mongolic, and Tungusic languages were for the most part borrowings and that the rest could be attributed to chance resemblances. They noted that there was little vocabulary shared by Turkic and Tungusic languages, though more shared with Mongolic languages. They reasoned that, if all three families had a common ancestor, we should expect losses to happen at random, and not only at the geographical margins of the family; and that the observed pattern is consistent with borrowing.

According to C. Schönig (2003), after accounting for areal effects, the shared lexicon that could have a common genetic origin was reduced to a small number of monosyllabic lexical roots, including the personal pronouns and a few other deictic and auxiliary items, whose sharing could be explained in other ways; not the kind of sharing expected in cases of genetic relationship.

==== The Sprachbund hypothesis ====
Instead of a common genetic origin, Clauson, Doerfer, and Shcherbak proposed (in 1956–1966) that Turkic, Mongolic, and Tungusic languages form a Sprachbund: a set of languages with similarities due to convergence through intensive borrowing and long contact, rather than common origin.

Asya Pereltsvaig further observed in 2011 that, in general, genetically related languages and families tend to diverge over time: the earlier forms are more similar than modern forms. However, she claims that an analysis of the earliest written records of Mongolic and Turkic languages shows the opposite, suggesting that they do not share a common traceable ancestor, but rather have become more similar through language contact and areal effects.

== Hypothesis about the original homeland ==
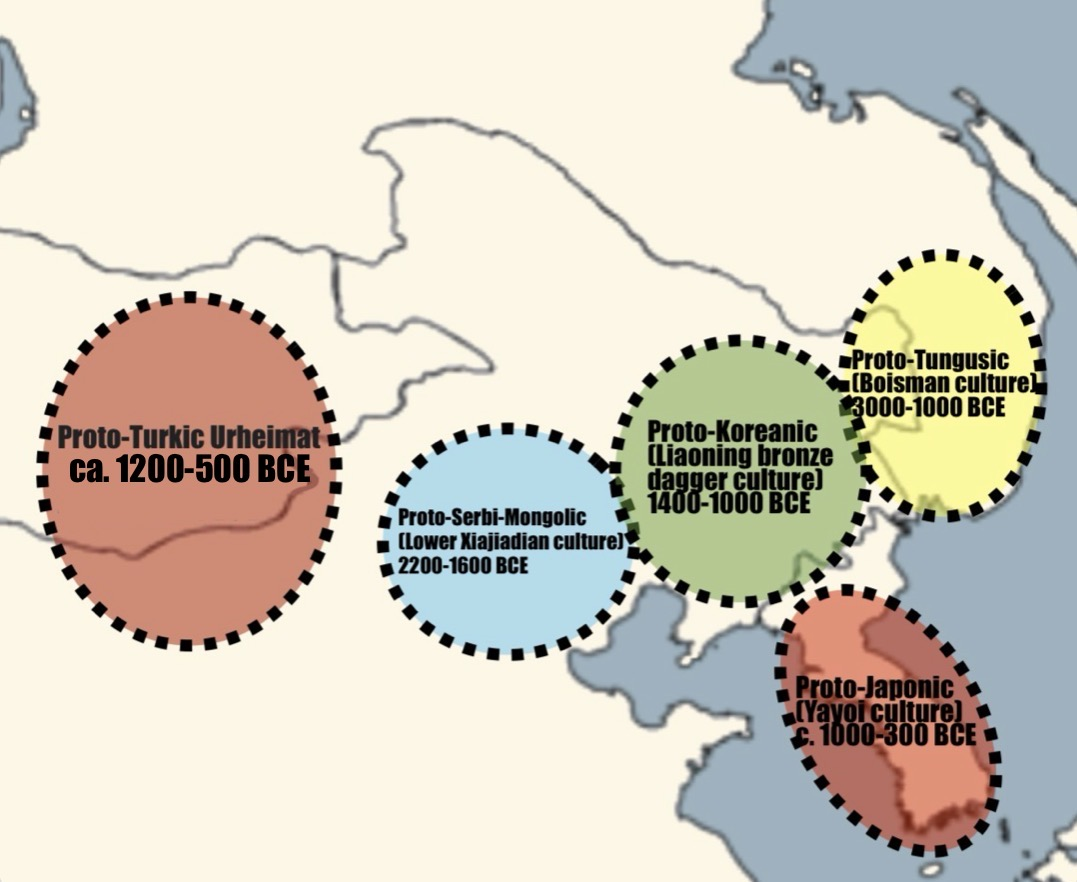
This map shows the most likely location of the Urheimats of the proposed Altaic languages. (Note: Attributed to multiple sources:)

The prehistory of the peoples speaking the "Altaic" languages is largely unknown. Whereas for certain other language families, such as the speakers of Indo-European, Uralic, and Austronesian, it is possible to frame substantial hypotheses, in the case of the proposed Altaic family much remains to be done.

Some scholars have hypothesised a possible Uralic and Altaic homeland in the Central Asian steppes.

Hypothesized homeland according to Blench (2009)

Chaubey and van Driem propose that the dispersal of ancient Altaic language communities is reflected by the early Holocene dissemination of haplogroup C2 (M217): "If the paternal lineage C2 (M217) is correlated with Altaic linguistic affinity, as appears to be the case for Turkic, Mongolic and Tungusic, then Japanese is no Father Tongue, and neither is Korean. This Y-chromosomal haplogroup accounts for 11% of Korean paternal lineages, and the frequency of the lineage is even more reduced in Japan. Yet this molecular marker may still be a tracer for the introduction of Altaic language to the archipelago, where the paternal lineage has persisted, albeit in a frequency of just 6%."

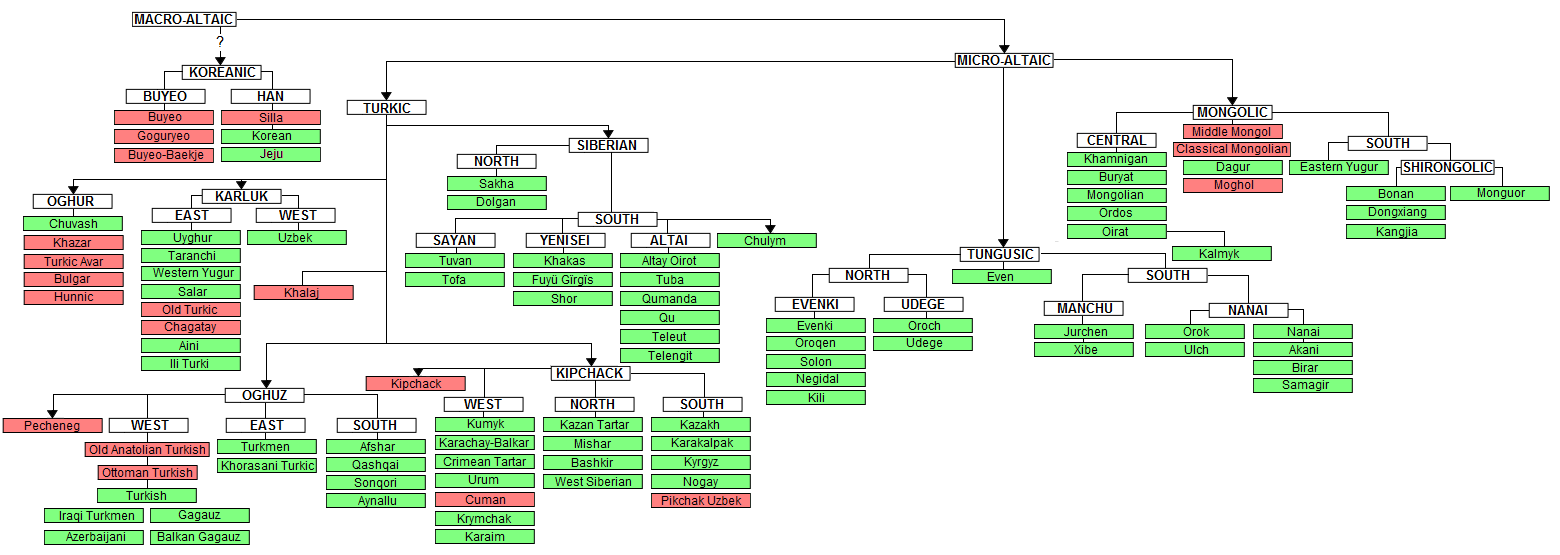
Detailed tree of the Altaic languages.

Juha Janhunen hypothesized that the ancestral languages of Turkic, Mongolic, Tungusic, Korean, and Japanese were spoken in a relatively small area comprising present-day North Korea, Southern Manchuria, and Southeastern Mongolia. However Janhunen is sceptical about an affiliation of Japanese to Altaic, while András Róna-Tas remarked that a relationship between Altaic and Japanese, if it ever existed, must be more remote than the relationship of any two of the Indo-European languages. S. Robert Ramsey stated that "the genetic relationship between Korean and Japanese, if it in fact exists, is probably more complex and distant than we can imagine on the basis of our present state of knowledge".

Supporters of the Altaic hypothesis formerly set the date of the Proto-Altaic language at around 4000 BC, but today at around 5000 BC or 6000 BC. This would make Altaic a language family older than Indo-European (around 3000 to 4000 BC according to mainstream hypotheses) but considerably younger than Afroasiatic (c. 10,000 BC or 11,000 to 16,000 BC according to different sources).

== See also ==
- Classification of the Japonic languages
- Nostratic languages
- Pan-Turanism
- Turco-Mongol
- Uralo-Siberian languages
- Xiongnu
- Comparison of Japanese and Korean
