= Japanese Korean =

Japanese Korean or Korean Japanese might refer to:

- Japan-Korea relations
- Japanese Korean Army
- Japanese people in North Korea
- Japanese people in South Korea
- Korea under Japanese rule
- Koreans in Japan, including Zainichi Koreans and Japanese citizens of Korean descent
  - The Zainichi Korean language, a variety of Korean spoken in Japan
- a hypothetical language family including Japanese and Korean, or some ancient languages of the Korean peninsula (Japanese–Koguryoic languages)
- Comparison of Japanese and Korean
