= Comparison of Japanese and Korean =

Linguistic comparison

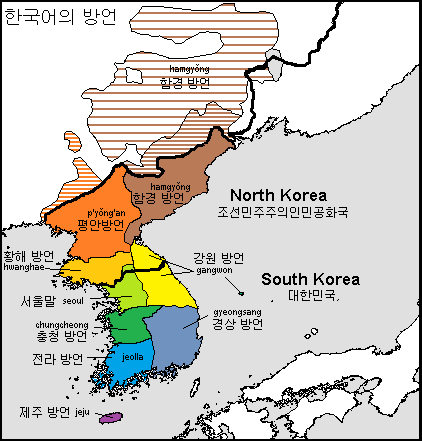
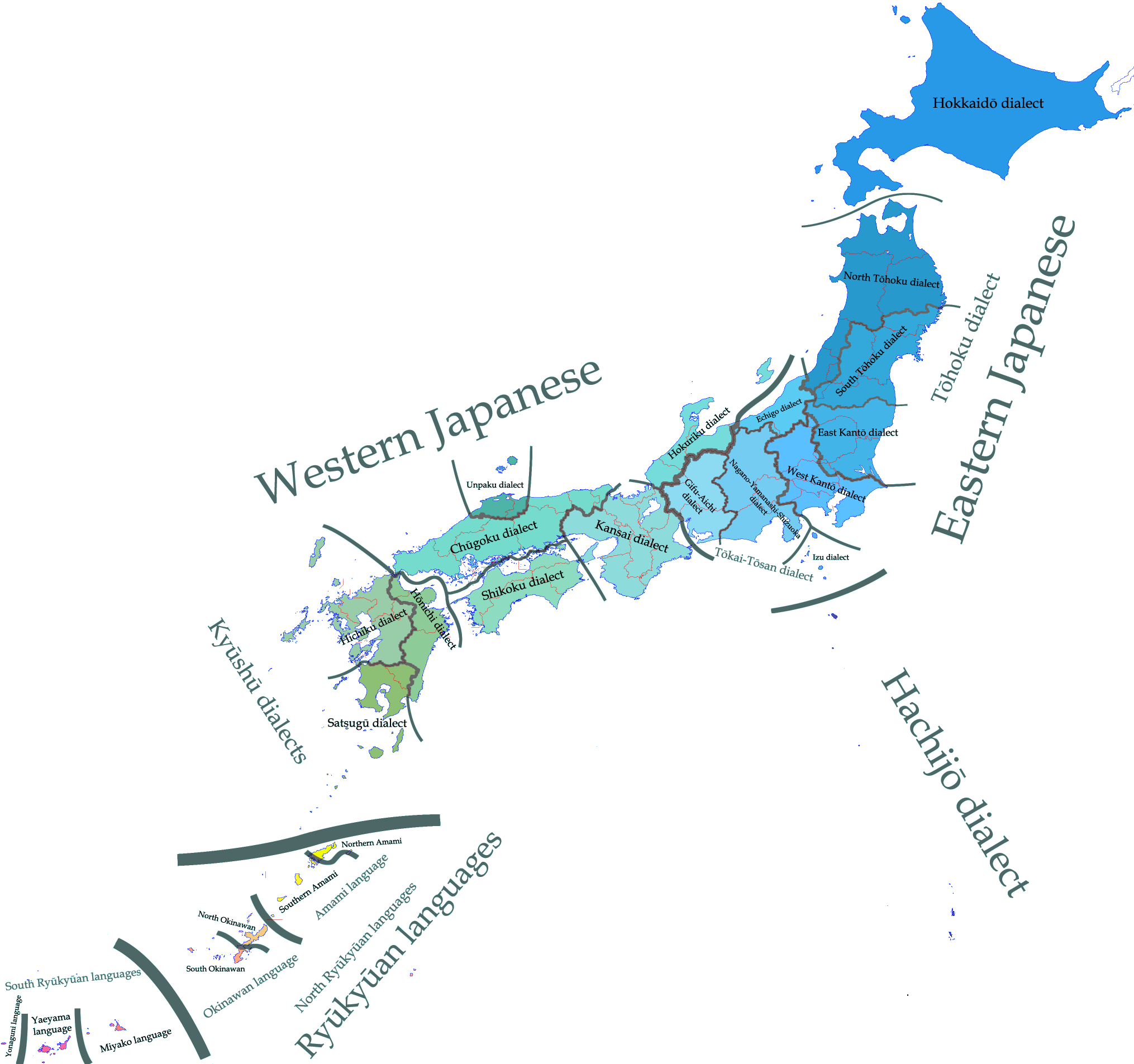
Map of Koreanic (left) and Japonic languages and dialects

The geographically proximate languages of Japanese (part of the Japonic languages) and Korean (part of the Koreanic languages) share considerable similarity in syntactic and morphological typology while having a small number of lexical resemblances. Observing the said similarities and probable history of Korean influence on Japanese culture, linguists have formulated different theories proposing a genetic relationship between them. (Note: Attributed to multiple sources:) These studies either lack conclusive evidence or were subsets of theories that have largely been discredited (like versions of the well-known Altaic hypothesis that mainly attempted to group the Turkic, Mongolian and Tungusic languages together). New research revived the possibility of a genealogical link, such as the Transeurasian hypothesis (a neo-Altaic proposal) by Robbeets et al., supported by computational linguistics and archaeological evidence, but it has many critics.

However, there is also more traditional comparative research affirming a genetic link between Japonic and Koreanic, see Classification of the Japonic languages § Japonic-Koreanic theory.

Korean and Japanese have very different native scripts (Hangul and kana, respectively), although they both make use of Chinese characters to some extent; Kanji still are a core part of modern Japanese orthography, while Hanja were historically used to write Korean. Today, Hanja are only used in South Korea for limited academic, legal, media, stylistic and disambiguation purposes and are not used at all in North Korea. Although both Hangul and the two modern kana systems (katakana and hiragana) show syllable/mora boundaries, Hangul syllable blocks break down into a featural alphabet, while the kana are essentially pure syllabaries.

== Overview ==
	Korean	Japanese
Speakers	83 million	126.4 million
Countries	South Korea; North Korea; China	Japan; Palau
Family	Koreanic	Japonic
Writing	Hangul, Hanja (South Korea), Idu, Gugyeol, Hyangchal (formerly)	Kana, Kanji, Man'yōgana (formerly)

== Grammar ==
Korean and Japanese both have an agglutinative morphology in which verbs may function as prefixes and a subject–object–verb (SOV) typology. They are both topic-prominent, null-subject languages. Both languages extensively turn nouns into verbs via the "to do" helper verbs (Japanese suru する; Korean hada 하다).

== Vocabulary ==
The two languages have been thought to not share any cognates (other than loanwords), for their vocabularies do not phonetically resemble each other.

However, a 2016 paper proposing a common lineage between Korean and Japanese traces around 500 core words thought to share a common origin. Most resembling lexicon in the study has been observed between Middle Korean (15th century) and earlier Old Japanese (8th century), some of which is shown in the following table:

Keyword	Middle Korean	Old Japanese	Proposed Proto-Japanese-Korean
abandons	stú ("scoops it out, removes a part from the whole")	sute ("abandons it, throws it away")	*sɨtu ("abandons it, throws it out")
adds	kwop ("doubles, increases it two-fold")	kupape ("adds it")	*kop ("increases it in number by adding")
(adjectivizer)	k ("adjectivizing suffix on nominals")	ka ("property suffix on nominals")	*k ("adjectivizing suffix on nominals") + *a ("deverbal")
avoids	skúy ("shuns, avoids; is unwilling")	sake ("avoids, dodges")	*səka ("avoids")
bamboo	táy ("bamboo") ?< *taGVy	takey ("bamboo")	*takəj
basket	kwulek ("[mesh] basket")	kwo ("basket")	*kura / *kuwa ("basket")
bear	kwom ("bear") < Proto-Korean *komá	kuma ("bear")	*koma ("bear")
below	aláy ("below")	aye ("falls to the ground")	*ar ("below")
bestows	kwomá ("reverence"), kwómáw ("honored, thankful")	kubar / kumar ("apportions and bestows")	*kuma ("bestows")
bird	say ("bird")	sagi ("heron; suffix in bird names")	*saŋi ("bird")
bites	kemelí ("leech"), kam-spol ("licks it up, sucks up food")	kam ("bites")	*kamɨ ("bites")
body	mwóm ("body") < Old Korean *muma	mu- / mwi ("body")	*mom ("body")
boils it	nóy ("smoke, vapor")	ni ("boils it")	*nəj ("boils it")
bottom	stáh ("ground")	sita ("below, bottom")	*sita ("bottom")
box	pakwoní ("basket")	pakwo ("box")	*pako ("box")
brings into life	wum ("a sprout, a shoot, a growth")	um ("gives birth to, brings into life")	*um ("brings into life")
bundles	mwusk ("binds it into a bundle")	musub ("binds it into a bundle")	*musu ("binds, bundles it")
buries it	wumúl ("well"), wúmh ("grain pit dug out of the ground"), wumwuk-ho ("is hollow")	ume ("buries it in the ground")	*umu ("buries it in the ground")
cage	wulí ("cage")	wori ("cage")	*orɨj ("cage")
carbon	swusk ("charcoal")	susu ("soot")	*susu ("soot; carbon")
carries on back	ep ("bears, carries on the back")	op ("bears on the back")	*əp ("carries on back")
carves a line	kuzu ("draws a line, rules")	kizam ("carves"), kisage ("shaves stone")	*kinsɨ ("carves, cuts a line")
cat	kwoy ("cat")	nekwo ("cat")	*ko ("cat")
ceremony	kwús ("exorcism, shamanistic ceremony")	kusi ("is strange, mysterious, otherworldly")	*kusuj ("shamanistic ceremony")
changes	kaph ("returns it, pays it back")	kap ("buys it"), kape ("exchanges, changes it"), kapar ("it changes")	*kap ("it changes, changes hands")
cheek	pwól ("cheek")	popo < *po-po ("cheek")	*por ("cheek")
chicken	tolk ("chicken")	tori ("bird, chicken")	*tərəŋ ("chicken")
closes it	tat ("closes it")	tat ("interrupts, cuts off, finishes it")	*tat ("closes it")
cloth	swowom ("cotton")	swo ("clothing; cloth; hemp")	*so ("cloth")
cloudy	skí ("gets dusty, cloudy")	sike ("sky gets cloudy")	*siki ("gets cloudy")
collects	kat ("collects it, gathers it in")	kate ("joins it, mixes it, adds it in")	*kat ("collects")
comes	ká ("goes")	ko ("comes")	*kə ("comes")
confines	kalm ("hides it, puts it away, keeps it, treasures it")	karame ("arrests it, catches and confines it")	*karama ("confines it")
congeals	kel ("thickens, congeals; is rich, thick")	kor ("it thickens, congeals")	*kərɨ ("it thickens, congeals")
correct	mac ("is correct"), maskaw ("is correct")	masa ("correct, upright")	*masa ("correct, upright")
countryside	wúy ánh ("countryside")	wi naka ("countryside")	*uj ("countryside") + inside
daytime	nác ("daytime; afternoon") < Early Middle Korean *nacay	natu ("summer")	*nacu ("daytime")
deep inside	swop / swok ("deep inside") ?< *swowók	oku ("deep inside, interior")	*owoku ("deep inside")
dissolves / lonely	súl ("disappears, dissolves, rusts"), sulgwú ("makes it dissolve, rusts"), sulphu ("is sad"), sulh ("is sad")	sabwi ("rusts"), sabu, EMJ sabi ("is sad, lonely")	*sɨr ("dissolves; sad, lonely")
drags	kuzu ("drags, draws, pulls")	kozi ("pulls out by the roots")	*kɨnsɨ ("drags out")
drawn in	pemúli ("gets drawn in"), pemúl ("surrounds, encircles"), pemúl ("intrudes in")	pame ("throws it in, drops it in")	*pamɨ ("it gets drawn in")
drops	twú ("keeps, leaves it as is, places it down")	otos ("drops it"), oti ("it drops down"), otor ("is low")	*ɨtɨ ("drops, puts down")
each	mata ("each one, every")	mata ("again; every"), mata-si ("all, complete")	*mata ("each, every")
edge	pask ("outside")	pasi ("outside edge")	*pasi ("edge")
empties	sku, pskú ("puts it out, turns off, extinguishes, quenches it")	suk ("empties, is empty")	*sukɨ ("empties")
end	patáng, Modern Korean patak ("sole, bottom")	pate ("limit, end"), patas ("makes it an end")	*pataŋ ("end")
enfolds	mek ("eats, holds in the mouth; harbors, takes in, has inside")	mak ("enfolds, rolls up, encircles")	*mek or *mak ("enfolds")
et cetera	(i)yá / (i)yé ("whether, or")	ya ("also, and the like")	*ja ("whether; et cetera")
evergreen	swól ("pine")	sugwi ("cryptomeria [japanese cedar]")	*suŋor ("evergreen")
exchanges	kaph ("repays") kaps ("price") < *kap ("exchanges")	kap ("buys")	*kap ("exchanges")
exhausts	cwuk ("dies")	tukwi ("is exhausted, used up") tukus ("exhausts it, uses it up")	*cuk ("is exhausted") + Proto-Japanese *wo ("active marker")
expresses emotion	noch ("face, expression")	natuk ("expresses emotion; is fond of")	*nəcuk ("expresses emotion")
extremity	kiph ("is deep")	kipa ("extremity")	*kipa ("depth, extremity")
faces	mwok ("neck")	muk ("turn one"s head, faces")	*mok ("faces")
faint	kaskaw ("is close to"), kezúy ("almost")	kasu-ka ("faint"), kasu ("barely")	*kasu ("faint")
farm field	path ("farm field")	pata, patake ("farm field")	*pata ("farm field")
fat	pwutúlew ("soft"), Modern Korean pwutwung ("chubby")	putwo ("fat")	*puto ("fat")
ferments	sek ("rots, ferments")	saka / sakey ("alcohol, rice wine")	*sek ("ripens, grows [rotten]")
fills	tam ("fills it up")	tamar ("it fills up"), tame ("fills it")	*tama ("fills it")
fire	púl ("fire")	pwi / po ("fire")	*pɨr ("fire")
flattens it	tatóm ("smooths cloth, trims it, rubs it together"), Modern Korean tatumicil ("beating cloth out to smooth it")	tatam ("folds it up, layers it"), tatami ("mat, flattened thing")	*tatəm ("folds, flattens it"), tatəm-i ("flattening")
fork	motoy ("joint, knuckle")	mata ("fork, bend; crotch")	*mataj or *mətaj ("fork, bend")
full	michu / micho ("reaches it")	mit ("gets full, reaches its limit")	*mica ("reaches, gets full")
gathers a crowd	múli / mwuli / mwúl ("crowd")	mure ("gathers a crowd")	*mur(u) ("gathers a crowd")
gets	et ("gets it")	atar ("gets it")	*atɨ ("gets it")
goes out	ná ("goes out; is born")	nar ("becomes")	*na ("goes out")
grabs	az ("grabs it")	asar ("scavenges it")	*asa ("grabs it")
harbors	phwúm ("embraces, harbors")	pukum ("harbor, comprise, contain")	*pukum ("embraces, harbors")
hatchet	nát ("sickle, scythe")	nata ("machete; small, thick bladed instrument")	*natə ("bladed instrument for chopping plants")
heart	kwokoyyang ("heart or core of vegetable, pith"), kwokáy ("head")	kokoro ("seat of feeling / thought; emotion")	*kəkərə ("the heart, core, essence")
heats with fire	tahí ("makes a fire, heats with fire")	tak ("heats with fire")	*taka ("heats with fire")
high	talak ("loft, attic")	take / taka ("height")	*takar ("height")
holds	motó, moti ("is long-lasting, is durable; keeps things")	mot ("holds")	*mətə ("holds")
hot	tew ("hot") tos / toso / tusu ("hot"), tusi ("warmly")	atu-si ("hot")	*ətu ("hot")
husk	kephí ("husk, bark")	kabi ("husk")	*kaŋpiri ("husk")
imposes	sikhó ("orders, commands"), sikpu ("wants [to do]")	sik ("imposes, lays out, takes a position, commands")	*sik ("makes, imposes")
indeed	kús ("certainly, without fail")	koso ("indeed, verily, without fail")	*kɨsə ("indeed") = *kɨ ("this") + *sə ("that, that thing")
inserts	pak ("inserts it, fills it")	pak ("puts on, slips on [lower body clothing, footwear])"	*pak ("puts it through")
(interrogative)	ká (interrogative suffix for yes/no questions)	ka (interrogative suffix (kmp); distal demonstrative)	*ka ("that [distal]"; interrogative suffix problematizing an identification)
island	syem ("island")	sima ("island"), sime ("closes it off")	*sima ("enclosed area; island")
jar	twok ("jar, pot")	tuki ("cup, saucer [for alcohol]")	*toki ("jar")
just	tamón / tamóyn ("only, just")	damwi ("just, about")	*tam ("just")
late	nuc ("is late")	noti ("later, afterwards")	*nɨc ("is late")
loves	kwoy ("is loved")	kwopwi ("loves")	*kopo ("loves it")
lurks	swúm ("hides, lurks in (of animals)")	sum ("lives, resides in")	*sum ("lurks, resides")
magpie	kachí ("magpie")	kasa-sagi ("magpie")	*kacɨ ("magpie"), + *saŋi ("bird")
meshes	elk ("binds, ties up, meshes together"), Modern Korean wolk ("weaves together")	or ("weaves")	*ər ("ties with string, rope, meshes")
mold	kwomphwúy ("mildew, mold grows")	kabwi ("mildew, mold")	*kənpom
mother	émí / émanim ("mother")	omo ("mother")	*əmə ("mother")
mows	kal ("plows it, cultivates it")	kar ("mows, harvests it")	*kara ("mows it")
much	manhó ("is many") man ("only, just")	mane-si, (s)amane-si ("many times, many")	*mana ("much") + *i ("be")
now	imúy, imuysye ("already")	ima ("now")	*imaj / *ima ("being interval; now")
odor	kwusu ("is pleasantly odorous")	kusa-si ("is smelly")	*kusa ("odor")
only	spwun ("only, just")	sapey ("if only, just")	*sapɨn ("only, just")
opens	akwoy ("hole, place where things come open or come apart")	ak ("it opens up")	*ak ("it opens")
picks up	tul ("holds up, raises")	tor ("picks up")	*tɨr ("picks up")
pigeon	pitwulí, pitwulki ("pigeon")	patwo ("pigeon")	*pato ("pigeon")
place	tóy ("place")	te ("place [suffix]")	*təj ("place [suffix]")
prepares water	kóm ("bathes (a bath)")	kum ("draws water")	*kɨmo ("draws, prepares water")
proceeds	pek ("is next, is after")	poka ("other, besides")	*pək ("comes after"), *pəka ("that which has come after")
rain	*mah ("east-asian rainy season, rain")	ama / ame ("rain")	*əmaŋ ("rain")
raptor	may ("eagle; suffix in bird names")	mey ("suffix in bird names")	*mari ("predatory bird; suffix in bird names")
rubs	moncí, moní ("strokes, touches it")	mom ("kneads, rubs")	*məm ("touches, rubs")
same	kóthó, kót, kotho ("is similar, same")	(no) goto si ("is similar, same")	*kətə ("same")
sea	patáh ("sea")	wata ("sea")	*wat-a ("that which has been crossed; sea")
seaweed(1)	mól ("seaweed")	mo, mey ("seaweed")	*mər ("seaweed")
section	kic ("a divided share")	kida / kita ("counter for cuts, sections; measurement of fabric and plots of land")	*kinca ("a cut, section")
sent out	pwonáy ("releases, sends it")	panas / panat ("releases it")	*pə-na ("see + go out")
sets it down	swuy ("it rests")	suwe ("sets it, sets it down")	*suwu ("sets it down")
shape	kací ("kind, sort, variety")	kata ("shape, form")	*kacaj / kaca ("shape")
shines	pozóy ("is shiny, is dazzled")	posi ("star")	*pəsə ("shines")
shuts in	kóm ("shuts [the eyes], closes [the eyes]")	komor ("is shut inside")	*kəmə ("shuts it in)
sidelines	yehúy / yehoy ("be separated from (a loved one)")	yoke ("avoids it, averts it")	*jəkə-i ("sidelines; is aside")
(simple past tense)	ke ("perfective verb marker")	ki ("simple past marker")	*kə ("past tense verb marker"), < *kə ("comes")
situation	pa ("place, situation, condition")	pa (conditional verb suffix; nominal topic/focus marker)	*pa ("place; situation")
skewers	kwoc ("skewers, stabs it") kwoc ("skewer")	kusi ("skewer")	*koc ("skewers it"), *koc-i ("a skewer")
skin	kaphól ("sheath"), kepcil ("bark")	kapa ("skin")	*kapa ("skin")
small bamboo	sasól ("bamboo branch, stick for drawing lots")	sasa ("bamboo grass, small bamboo")	*sasa ("small bamboo")
small piece	cwokak ("piece, shard")	sukwo-si ("little bit")	*cok ("is a small piece")
snake	póyyám / póyam ("snake")	peymi ("snake")	*pəjami ("snake")
soaks through	súmúy ("permeates it, soaks through it")	some ("dyes it")	*sɨmɨ ("it soaks through")
sour	soy, swuy ("turns sour")	suyur ("turns sour")	*sɨju ("turns sour")
speaks	íp ("mouth")	ip ("says")	*ip ("speaks")
spider	kemúy ("spider")	kumo ("spider")	*komo ("spider")
splits it	kask ("trims, cuts it")	sak ("splits it")	*sak ("splits it by cutting")
stale	kwut ("is hard")	kutar ("gets old, stale, rotten")	*kut ("gets stale, hard")
suits for use	psú ("uses it")	pusap ("suits, is suitable")	*pusa ("uses it; suits it for use")
sun	hóy ("sun; year")	ka / key ("day"), koyomi ("calendar")	*xəj ("sun")
swamp	nwup ("swamp, bog")	numa ("swamp, bog")	*nu ("swamp, wet")
swells	pulu / pull ("gets full, (stomach) swells")	puye ("increases, swells", puyas ("makes it increase")	*purɨr ("swells")
takes in	tothwó ("fights"), thi ("strikes"), tho ("takes in, receives")	tatak ("strikes"), tatakap ("fights")	*takə ("takes in, receives"), *ta(r)takə ("strikes")
that (mesial)	so ("the fact, the thing"; complementizer)	so ("that [mesial]")	*sə ("that [mesial]"; complementizer))
this	ku ("that (mesial)")	ko ("this (proximal)")	*kɨ ("this (proximal)")
time period	woláy ("long time")	wori ("period of time, time")	*orɨj ("period of time")
time when	cek, cey ("time when")	toki ("time when")	*ceki ("time when")
together	tamós ("together")	tomo ("together; companion")	*təmə ("together") + pk *s ("substantive")
uproar	sa(g)wónaw ("is rough, wild, fierce")	sawak ("is noisy, bustling"), sawa'-sawa ("noisy")	*sawə ("uproarious")
vacant	pwuy ("is empty")	pima ("open, spare time")	*pi ("vacant")
valued	pum ("matters, bears a connection to")	pome ("praises it")	*pɨm ("is valued")
walks	ke:t- ("walks")	kati ("walking")	*katu ("walks")
wasp	pátólí ("yellowjacket")	pati ("bee")	*pator ("wasp")
waterlogged	mol ("soaks it in liquid")	mor ("leaks"), mor ("fills up")	*mər ("gets filled with water, water-logged")
wears	kís ("lapel, collar; outer layer of cloth")	ki ("wears on the body")	*ki ("wears on the body")
weaves	pcó ("weaves together")	pata ("loom; woven cloth")	*pəca ("weaves")
wet highland	swúp, swuphúl, swúh ("forest")	sapa ("swamp, mountain, marsh, glen")	*sɨpa ("wet highland")
what	musúk ("what") musu ("what, which [prenoun])") < *musuk	mosi ("perchance"; adverb introducing polar interrogatives)	*mɨsɨŋ ("which")
whether	na ("whether, or, although")	na ("whether or, both, and")	*na ("whether")
wild field	nwón ("wet field")	nwo ("wild field, plain")	*non or *no ("wild field")
wishes	pólá- ("wishes it")	por- ("wishes it")	*pə-ara- ("wishes it")
woman	myenól, myenólí, myenúlí ("daughterinlaw")	mye ("woman, wife") < Proto-Japanese *me	*me ("woman")
wood	kuluh ("tree stump")	kwi ("tree, wood") < *kəj	*kɨr ("wood")
word	kolochí ("instructs, teaches"), kol ("words, speaking"), ilkhot/l ("calls out")	koto ("word; thing"), katar ("tells")	*kətə ("word; thing [non-concrete]")
wraps	cwúm, cwumekwúy ("fist")	tum ("grasps, wraps")	*cum ("wraps, grasps in hand")

Although fewer in number, there have been also comparisons between stages other than Old Japanese and Middle Korean:

Keyword	Koreanic	Japonic	Proposed Proto-Japanese-Korean
(negative)	aní (verbal negative; negative copula)	PJ *an (verbal negative)	*an (negative)
deep	NK phwuk ("deeply, fully")	OJ puka si ("is deep")	*puka ("deep")
numb	ENK kwop ("is numb, stiff from cold")	OJ kopor ("freezes")	*kəpə ("is numb")
slope	ENK swok ("droops, becomes slanted down")	OJ saka ("down slope")	*səka ("slope")
soaks	ENK chwuk ("gets wet")	OJ tuke ("soaks it")	*cuku ("soaks")
traps	ENK kali ("fish trap")	OJ kar ("traps, hunts, catches an animal")	*kara ("traps, hunts")
ground	MK mith ("base, bottom")	PJ *mita ("ground, dry earth")	*mita ("ground")
(kin prefix)	PK *a ("kinship prefix")	OJ a ("my; kinship prefix")	*a ("my; kinship prefix")
land	PK *na ("land, ground")	pre-OJ *na ("earth, land")	*na ("land, ground")
deceived	MK swok ("is deceived"), swokí ("deceives it")	MJ sukas ("deceives it")	*sok ("is deceived")
dreams	MJ skwú ("dreams")	MJ suk ("is infatuated, has passion"), suki ("refinement; lust, passion")	*sɨku ("fantasizes, idealizes")

In addition to the above, there may be a relation between the words for morning (朝, asa; 아침, achim). A historical variant in Korean may have been pronounced "asa" (see: Asadal).

There is a minority theory attributing the name of the Japanese city of Nara to a loanword from Korean (see: Nara, Nara#Etymology).

=== Numerals ===
Similarities have been drawn between the four attested numerals of Goguryeo, a possible ancient Korean relative, and its equivalents in Old Japanese.

Numeral	Goguryeo	Old Japanese
3	mil	mi_{1}
5	uc	itu
7	na-nin	nana
10	dok	to_{2} / to_{2}wo

Note: See Jōdai Tokushu Kanazukai for information on Old Japanese subscript notation.

== Writing ==
Both languages use, to some extent, a combination of native scripts and Chinese characters.

Korean is mostly written in the Korean featural alphabet (known as Hangul in South Korea and Chosŏn'gŭl in North Korea). The traditional hanja (Chinese characters adapted for Korean) are sometimes used in South Korea, but only for specific purposes such as to clarify homophones (especially in TV show subtitles), linguistic or historic study, artistic expression, legal documents, and newspapers. Native Korean words do not use hanja anymore. In North Korea, the hanja have been largely suppressed in an attempt to remove Chinese influence, although they are still used in some cases and the number of hanja taught in North Korean schools is greater than that of South Korean schools.

Japanese is written with a combination of kanji (Chinese characters adapted for Japanese) and kana (two writing systems representing the same sounds, composed primarily of syllables, each used for different purposes). Unlike Korean hanja, however, kanji can be used to write both Sino-Japanese words and native Japanese words.

Historically, both Korean and Japanese were written solely with Chinese characters, with the writing experiencing a gradual mutation through centuries into its modern form.

== Honorifics ==
Both languages have similar elaborate, multilevel systems of honorifics, and furthermore both Korean and Japanese also separate the concept of honorifics from formality in speech and writing in their own ways (See Korean speech levels and Honorific speech in Japanese § Grammatical overview). They are cited as the two most elaborate honorific systems, perhaps unrivaled by any other languages. It has been argued that certain honorific words may share a common origin. Uniquely, the honorifics rely heavily on changing verb conjugations rather than only using T–V distinction or other common methods of signifying honorifics. See Korean honorifics and Japanese honorifics.

== See also ==
- Baekje language
- Classification of the Japonic languages § Japonic-Koreanic theory
- Japonic languages
- Koreanic languages
- Peninsular Japonic
