= Stefan Georg =

German linguist (born 1962)

Ralf-Stefan Georg (November 7, 1962 in Bottrop) is a German linguist. He is currently Professor at the University of Bonn in Bonn, Germany, for Altaic Linguistics and Culture Studies.

== Education ==
Georg earned an M.A. in Mongolian Linguistics, Indo-European and Semitic Linguistics at Bonn University (1990), and later completed his Ph.D. (Central Asian Studies, Indo-European and Manchu Studies), with a descriptive grammar of the Thakali language (a Tibeto-Burman language of Mustang in Mid-Western Nepal), at the same institution (1995).

== Research ==
Since 1992, Georg has been engaged in linguistic fieldwork and the writing of descriptive grammars of unwritten/endangered/understudied languages. Apart from a grammar of a Thakali dialect, he has co-authored a grammar of Itelmen (Chukchi–Kamchatkan language family) and written a grammar of Ket (Yeniseian languages), as well as shorter grammatical descriptions of Ordos Mongolian and Huzhu Mongghul (a variety of the so-called Monguor group).

He has published widely on problems of language classification, especially on the controversy surrounding the Altaic hypothesis (the putative genetic relationship between the Turkic, Mongolic, and Tungusic language families to which Korean and Japanese are sometimes added). He belongs to the critics of this hypothesis and argues for a non-genetic, areal interpretation of the commonalities between these languages. Other fields of interest he is active in include Palaeosiberian languages, Tibeto-Burman languages, Indo-European and Kartvelian linguistics and linguistic typology.

== Publications ==
- Georg, Stefan (1996). Marphatan Thakali. Untersuchungen zur Sprache des Dorfes Marpha im Oberen Kali-Gandaki-Tal/Nepal. München: LINCOM EUROPA. ISBN 90-04-09905-0.
- Georg, Stefan; Volodin, Alexander P. (1999). Die itelmenische Sprache. Wiesbaden: Harrassowitz. ISBN 3-447-04115-3.
- Georg, Stefan, Peter A. Michalove, Alexis Manaster Ramer, and Paul J. Sidwell (1999): "Telling general linguists about Altaic." Journal of Linguistics 35:65–98. Mongolian translation: Ерөнхий хэл шинжлэлчид алтай судлалын тухай. Алтай Судлал/Studia Altaica I/2001: 174-215 (transl.: P. Ajuulzhav/G. Tujaa/O. Sambuudorzh).
- Georg, Stefan (1999/2000): Haupt und Glieder der altaischen Hypothese: die Körperteilbezeichnungen im Türkischen, Mongolischen und Tungusischen (= Head and members of the Altaic hypothesis: The body-part designations in Turkic, Mongolic, and Tungusic'). Ural-altaische Jahrbücher, neue Folge B 16: 143–182.
- Georg, Stefan (2001): Türkisch/Mongolisch tengri "Himmel/Gott" und seine Herkunft. Studia Etymologica Cracoviensia 6: 83–100.
- Georg, Stefan (2002): Altaic Languages. In: David Levinson and Karen Christensen (eds.): Encyclopedia of Modern Asia, Vol. 1. New York: Charles Scribner's Sons: 86–87.
- Georg, Stefan (2003) Ordos. In: J. Janhunen (ed.): The Mongolic Languages. London: Routledge: 193–209.
- Georg, Stefan (2003a): Mongghul, in: J. Janhunen (ed.): The Mongolic Languages. London: Routledge: 286–306.
- Georg, Stefan (2003b): The Gradual Disappearance of a Eurasian Language Family – The Case of Yenisseyan. In: M. Janse and S. Tol (eds.): Language Death and Language Maintenance. Theoretical, Practical and Descriptive Approaches. Amsterdam: Benjamins: 89–106.
- Georg, Stefan; Vovin, Alexander (2003). "From Mass Comparison to Mess Comparison: Greenberg's "Eurasiatic" Theory". Diachronica. 20 (2): 331–362. doi:10.1075/dia.20.2.06geo.
- Georg, Stefan (2004). "Review of Etymological Dictionary of the Altaic Languages". Diachronica. 21 (2): 445–450. doi:10.1075/dia.21.2.12geo.
- Georg, Stefan (2004). "Unreclassifying Tungusic". In C. Naeher (ed.). Proceedings. First International Conference on Manchu-Tungus Studies (Bonn, August 28 – September 1, 2000). Vol. 2: Trends in Tungusic and Siberian Linguistics. Wiesbaden: Harrassowitz. pp. 45–57.
- Georg, Stefan; Vovin, Alexander (2005). "Review of Indo-European and Its Closest Relatives: The Eurasiatic language family". Diachronica. 2 (22:1): 184–191. doi:10.1075/dia.22.1.09geo.
- Georg, Stefan (2007). A Descriptive Grammar of Ket (Yenisei-Ostyak). Vol. I: Introduction, Phonology, Morphology. Folkestone: Global Oriental. ISBN 978-1-901903-58-4.
- Georg, Stefan (2008): Yeniseic languages and the Siberian linguistic area In: A. Lubotsky, J. Schaeken and J. Wiedenhof (eds.): Evidence and Counter-Evidence. Festschrift Frederik Kortlandt, Vol.I. Amsterdam/New York: Rodopi.
