= Johannes Benzing =

German diplomat (1913–2001)

- Born: 13 January 1913; Schwenningen, German Empire
- Died: 16 March 2001 (aged 88); Bovenden, Lower Saxony, Germany
- Occupations: Turkologist; linguist
- Years active: National Socialism and in the Federal Republic of Germany
- Known for: Linguist in Pers Z S and establishment of Iranistics as an academic discipline at the University of Mainz.
- Title: Prof. Dr. Phil. Habil.
- Spouse: Käte Benzing

Academic background
- Education: Humboldt University of Berlin
- Thesis: Über die Verbformen im Türkmenischen

Johannes Benzing (13 January 1913 – 16 March 2001) was a German Turkic specialist and diplomat in the era of National Socialism and in the Federal Republic of Germany. Benzing worked as a linguist in Pers Z S, the signals intelligence agency of the German Foreign Office (German: Auswärtiges Amt). He was the youngest senior official (German: Beamter) and headed the section from October 1939 until September 1944.

== Life ==
After high school, Benzing discovered his profound interest in scholarly issues. In 1938, Benzing moved to Berlin to take up Oriental Studies. At the Humboldt University of Berlin, Benzing studied Islamic philology with Richard Hartmann, Hans Heinrich Schaeder and Walther Björkman, and Turcology with Annemarie von Gabain, and Mongolistics with Erich Haenisch. At the same time, he acquired practical knowledge of oriental languages at the Oriental Seminar, where Gotthard Jäschke and Sebastian Beck were among his teachers. He also learnt Tatar from Saadet Ishaki (Çagatay), the daughter of the famous Tatar intellectual Ayaz İshaki. In 1939, Benzing took his examination for promotion of Dr. phil with a thesis on the verbal system of Turkmen, Über die Verbformen im Türkmenischen. In 1942, Benzing habilitated with a thorough study on the subject Chuvash language, called Tschuwaschische Forschungen. At that time, in the middle of the war, Benzing was unable to get an adequate position at a university. Instead he found an occupation in the Ministry of Foreign Affairs. He became a member of the SA in June 1936, and joined the NSDAP in October 1940. From 1937 onwards he held various functions within the NSDAP.

He was interned between 1945 and 1946. There is no information available about his denazification. He worked for the French Ministry of Foreign Affairs, between 1950 and 1955 in Paris, where he established close contacts with the leading French Orientalists (Orientalism). In 1953, he was elected a member of the Oriental Commission of the newly established Academy of Sciences and Literature at Mainz. In 1955, he joined the Ministry of Foreign Affairs of the Federal Republic of Germany and was one year later appointed consul of the Cultural Section at the Consulate General in Istanbul. Besides his diplomatic duties, Benzing gave courses in Turkic languages at the Turcological Department of the Faculty of Letters (Turkish:Edebiyat Fakültesi) of the University of Istanbul. Sporadically he also taught Turcology at the German universities of Tübingen and Mainz. On 4 December 1963 Johannes Benzing was appointed full professor (German:Ordinarius) in Oriental studies (Islamic philology and Islamic studies) (German:Islamische Philologie and Islamkunde) at the Faculty of Art, Johannes Gutenberg University Mainz, as the successor of Professor Helmuth Scheel. On 25 February 1966 he was elected Ordinary Member of the Academy of Sciences and Literature in Mainz. In 1973, he moved to become Professor of the Oriental Studies, Department of Philology in Mainz, which he continued until 1981.

Together with his fellow professors Georg Buddruss and Helmut Humbach, he arranged interdisciplinary seminars on Central Asian languages, e.g. Pamir languages, Tajik, Khotanese and Tokharian. It was also Benzing who took the initiative to establish Iranistics as an academic discipline at Mainz.

Benzing always dealt with the written word in a highly economical way and communicated many of his ideas in oral discussions only, without ever committing them to paper. After the long mobile phases of his life, he did not want to leave Mainz, so he never attended conferences and congresses. On the other hand, he permanently welcomed visiting scholars from all parts of the world, sharing his knowledge and deep insights with them.

On 31 March 1981 Benzing retired from his position at the University of Mainz. Soon after the retirement, he and his wife Käte left Mainz and settled in the borough of Erdmannsweiler in Königsfeld im Schwarzwald, close to their birthplace in the Black Forest. In March 1998, they moved to Bovenden to stay with their daughter, the ethnologist, social anthropologist and Africanist, professor Brigitta Benzing-Wolde Georgis (1941-2023), and her husband, Dr. Kahsai Wolde Georgis.

== Work ==
Benzing continued the tradition of Willi Bang-Kaup's Berlin school of linguistic Turcology, though broadening its scope and refining its scholarly working procedures. Besides publishing books and articles, Benzing devoted much time and care to instructive book reviews containing analyses and complementary remarks on scholarly questions. A selection of these reviews: Critical contributions to ancient literature and Turkology (German: Kritische Beiträge zur Altaistik und Turkologie), appeared in 1988 as volume 3 in the series Turcologica magazine (Harrassowitz). Historical-comparative research on Turkic, Tungusic and Mongolic languages was Benzing's main field of interest, to which he contributed many studies. One example of this is Benzing's critical occupation with the so-called Altaic question, the still controversial problem of a possible genetic relatedness of Turkic, Mongolic and Tungusic (maybe even Korean and Japanese). In a truly visionary paper: Menless land: Inner and North Asia as a philological work area (German:Herrenloses Land: Inner und Nordasien als philologisches Arbeitsgebiet), he argued that the ‘ownerless’ territory of Inner and Northern Asia, filling a fifth of the world's surface, should finally be subject to comprehensive scholarly study.

On 20 July 1937 Benzing joined Pers Z S. He was the youngest senior Beamter in the Pers Z S unit. A linguist, he was a specialist in Near Eastern languages and originally worked under Dr Scherschmidt. He headed this section from October 1939 until September 1944. He was then placed in charge of work for Iranian, Iraqi and Afghan systems.

== Publications ==
- Benzing, Johannes; Schönig, Claus (1993). Bolgarisch-tschuwaschische Studien [Bolgarian-Chuvash studies] (in German). Wiesbaden: Harrassowitz. ISBN 978-3-447-03341-1. OCLC 31196447.
- Benzing, Johannes (1988). Johanson, Lars; Schönig, Claus (eds.). Kritische Beiträge zur Altaistik und Turkologie: Festschrift für Johannes Benzing [Critical Contributions to Altaic Studies and Turkology: Festschrift for Johannes Benzing]. Turcologica (in German). Vol. 3. Wiesbaden: O. Harrassowitz. ISBN 9783447027663. OCLC 925285662.
- Benzing, Johannes (1985). Kalmückische Grammatik zum Nachschlagen [Kalmyk grammar for reference] (in German). Wiesbaden: O. Harrassowitz. ISBN 978-3-447-02503-4. OCLC 134280509.
- Benzing, Johannes; Taraf, Zahra; Humbach, Helmut (1983). Chwaresmischer Wortindex: mit einer Einleitung von Helmut Humbach [Chwaresmischer Wortindex: with an introduction by Helmut Humbach] (in German). Wiesbaden: Harrassowitz. ISBN 9783447023627. OCLC 12133046.
- Benzing, Johannes (1977). Islamische Rechtsgutachten als volkskundliche Quelle [Islamic legal opinions as an ethnographic source] (in German). Wiesbaden: Steiner [in Komm.] ISBN 9783515026284. OCLC 3889237.
- Benzing, Johannes (1955). Die tungusischen Sprachen Versuch e. vergl. Grammatik [73251561]. Akademie der Wissenschaften und der Literatur Abhandlungen Geistes- und sozialwissenschaftliche Klasse, Jg. 1955 (in German). Vol. 11. Mainz, Wiesbaden: Verl. d. Akad. d. Wiss. u.d. Literatur Steiner in Komm. OCLC 73251561.
- Benzing, Johannes (1955). Lamutische Grammatik : mit Bibliographie, Sprachproben und Glossar Lamutische Grammatik : mit Bibliographie, Sprachproben und Glossar [Lamutian grammar : with bibliography, language samples and glossary Lamutian grammar : with bibliography, language samples and glossary]. Veröffentlichungen der Orientalischen Kommission. Vol. 6. Weisbaden: F. Steiner. OCLC 4798767.
- Benzing, Johannes (1953). Einführung in das Studium der altaischen Philologie und der Turkologie [Introduction to the study of Altaic philology and Turkology] (in German). Weisbaden: Otto harrasowitz. doi:10.25673/35719. OCLC 4523112.
- Benzing, Johannes (1943). Deutsch-tschuwaschisches Wörterverzeichnis, nebst kurzem tschuwaschischen Sprachführe [German-Chuvash dictionary, together with a short guide to the Chuvash language] (in German). Berlin: Verlagsanstalt, O. Stollberg. OCLC 236090662.
- Benzing, Johannes. Turkestan, Die Bücherei des Ostraumes [Turkestan, The Library of the Eastern Region] (in German). Berlin: O. Stollberg. OCLC 16583429.
- Benzing, Johannes (1939). Über die Verbformen im Türkmenischen (Doctorate thesis). Humboldt University of Berlin. OCLC 1222693781.
- Benzing, Johannes (1968). Das chwaresmische Sprachmaterial einer Handschrift der Muqaddimat al-Adab von Zamaxšarı̄ (in German). Wiesbaden: F. Steiner. OCLC 1572325.. Manuscript of "Muqaddimat al-Adab" Arabic-Persian dictionary
