= Talât Tekin =

Turkish Turkologist (1927–2015)

- Mehmet Talât Tekin
- Born: July 16, 1927; Tavşancıl, Dilovası
- Died: November 28, 2015 (aged 88); Bodrum
- Children: Özlem Tekin

Academic background
- Education: Istanbul University, University of California, Los Angeles
- Thesis: A Grammar of Orkhon Turkic (1965)

Academic work
- Discipline: Turkology
- Institutions: Hacettepe University, Yeditepe University

Mehmet Talât Tekin (July 16, 1927, Tavşancıl, Dilovası - November 28, 2015, Bodrum) was a Turkish linguist, Turkologist, researcher and writer who made important contributions to Turkology, the study of Old Turkic inscriptions, and Altaistics.

== Biography ==
Tekin was born on July 16, 1927, to İsmail and Fatımatüzzehra Tekin in the Tavşancıl district of Gebze (now a district of Dilovası). He attended primary school at Tavşancıl Primary School, junior high at Üsküdar Paşakapısı Junior High School, and attended high school at Haydarpaşa High School, graduating in 1945. In 1946 entered Istanbul University and studied in the Department of Turkish Language and Literature, receiving his degree in 1951. Between 1951 and 1957, Tekin taught at various high schools and performed military service in Kırklareli.

In 1961 Tekin was appointed as a research assistant in the Near Eastern Languages Department at the University of California, Los Angeles, where he began his doctoral studies with Janós Eckmann. During this time he taught Turkish for two years at Indiana University Bloomington. He received his PhD in June, 1965 with this thesis A Grammar of Orkhon Turkic. From 1965 to 1972 he worked as a professor of Turkish language and literature at University of California, Berkeley. In 1970 he defended a thesis at Istanbul University entitled Ana Türkçede Aslî Uzun Ünlüler (Primary long vowels in Proto-Turkic), and was appointed associate professor. He returned to Turkey in 1972 and joined the Department of Turkish Language and Literature at Hacettepe University in Ankara. He was appointed a professor there after publishing his book Volga Bulgar kitabeleri ve Volga Bulgarcası (Volga Bolgar inscriptions and the Volga Bolgar language).

In 1991, Tekin founded the journal Türk Dilleri Araştırmaları/Researches in Turkic Languages ISSN 1300-5316.

Tekin retired in 1994, but worked part time as a lecturer at Bilkent University, and in 1997 moved to Istanbul to serve as the head of the Department of Turkish language and Literature at Yeditepe University until his ultimate retirement in 2002. In 2004 he received a service award from the Turkish Academy of Sciences.

According to the obituary published by the Turkish Language Association, "he was the teacher of all Turkology students with his articles and books, and with A Grammar of Orkhon Turkic, he was the best known and most widely read Turkish linguist outside Turkey."

== Scholarship ==
Tekin published over 200 articles during his lifetime, and published at least 35 books. At least two Festschrifts were published in his honor, both of which contain bibliographies of his work. Many of his works were collected in a three volume set entitled Makaleler.

Tekin had a broad range of interest within the field of Turkology. Many of his early works focused on the philology of old Turkic languages, including the language of the Orkhon inscriptions, the language and inscriptions of the Bulgars, the language of the Huns, and Karakhanid poetry. He was interested in lexicology, publishing a Turkmen-Turkish dictionary and working on various dictionaries and glossaries of both living and dead Turkic languages. He was also interested in the reconstruction of Proto-Turkic, and was influential in compiling evidence to reconstruct certain sound correspondences between Chuvash and the other Turkic languages, such as Chuvash /*r/-Turkic /*z/ and Chuvash /*l/-Turkic/*š/. Although there remains significant debate regarding the reconstruction of the /*r/~/*z/ correspondence, Tekin's (1975) solution to the /*l/~/*š/ correspondence is widely accepted.

Tekin was a major proponent of the Altaic theory, a theory which he interpreted to mean that the Turkic, Mongolic, Tungusic, and Korean language families are all related. Although he had a particular interest in the relationship of Japanese to the Altaic languages, he did not necessarily believe it to be a member of the Altaic family.

== Selected publications ==
- Tekin, Talât (1968). A grammar of Orkhon Turkic. Bloomington: Indiana University. OCLC 1304370.
- Tekin, Talât (1975). "Further evidence for «Zetacism» and «Sigmatism»". In Ligeti, Louis (ed.). Researches in Altaic languages: papers read at the 14th meeting of the Permanent International Altaistic Conference, held in Szeged, August 22-28, 1971. Budapest: Akadémiai Kiado. pp. 275–284. ISBN 9789630501248.
- Tekin, Talât (1987). Tuna Bulgarları ve dilleri. Ankara: Türk Dil Kurumu. OCLC 18986920.
- Tekin, Talât (1988). Volga Bulgar kitabeleri ve Volga Bulgarcası. Ankara: Türk Tarih Kurumu Basımevi. ISBN 975-16-0066-9. OCLC 22176911.
- Tekin, Talat (1995). Türkmence-Türkçe sözlük. Ankara: Simurg Kitapçılık ve Yayıncılık. ISBN 9789757172031. OCLC 36051662.
- Tekin, Talat (2003). Yılmaz, Emine; Demir, Nurettin (eds.). Makaleler. Ankara: Grafiker Yayınları. ISBN 9789759272142. OCLC 52308663.
