= Tavşancıl =

Neighborhood in Kocaeli Province, Turkey

Coordinates: 40°46′20″N 29°34′25″E

Tavşancıl is a neighborhood in Dilovası District, Kocaeli Province, Turkey. It is located on the north shore of the Gulf of İzmit, a few kilometers east of the Osman Gazi Bridge. Its population is 2,501 (2025).

== History ==
The Tavşancıl region was conquered by the Ottomans in the early 1300s. A village called Gemiciler (“shipbuilders”) was established in the area for shipbuilding. The region was returned to the Byzantines by Süleyman Çelebi in 1403, but was then reconquered by Mehmet II in the mid-1400s. The village of Tavşancıl, also known as Kırkık, was established to support Selim I’s mosque and imaret in Istanbul.

A Tavşancıl Village Mosque existed in the 18th century (but was probably not the same as either of the two current mosques in Tavşancıl).

In 1841, the village included 141 households, with a male population of 393. The village had one imam at that time. One villager owned a black slave named Abedan.

== Historic structures ==
The neighborhood features over 60 historical houses, up to 700 years old.

The Tavşancıl Central (Merkez) Mosque was built in an unknown year, but repaired during the reign of Abdülhamit II.

The Seyid Hacı Veliüddin Ağa Mosque, generally called the Tavşancıl Market (Çarşı) Mosque, was built in 1817. It was severely damaged in the 1999 earthquake, but was restored in 2013.

The neighborhood also includes a historic hamam.
