= Alexis Manaster Ramer =

American linguist (born 1956)

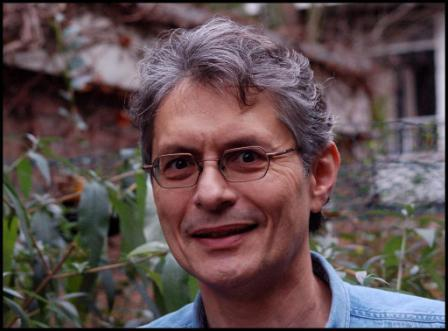
- Born: 1956 (age 69–70)
- Occupation: Linguist

Academic background
- Education: University of Chicago

Academic work
- Main interests: Mathematical linguistics, linguistic typology, comparative linguistics

Alexis Manaster Ramer (born 1956) is a Polish-born American linguist (PhD 1981, University of Chicago).

== Work ==
Ramer has published extensively on syntactic typology (esp. in relation to Australian, Eskimo, and Austronesian languages); on phonological theory and its relation to phenomena such as versification and speech errors; on comparative linguistics and etymology (Indo-European, Uto-Aztecan, Yiddish), on glottochronology and genetic classification of languages (Nostratic, Altaic, Haida-Nadene, Pakawan/Coahuiltecan, Tonkawa-Nadene); on poetics (Vedic, Homeric, medieval Yiddish); and on the history of linguistics.

Manaster Ramer is the founder of the ACL special interest group on Mathematical linguistics (SIGMOL) and the organizer of the first Mathematics of Language conference.

He is honored by a festschrift edited by Fabrice Cavoto, The Linguist's Linguist: A Collection of Papers in Honour of Alexis Manaster Ramer, Munich: LINCOM Europa, 2002.
