= Middle Japanese =

Middle Japanese may refer to:

- Early Middle Japanese, a Japanese linguistic period spanning c. 800–1200
- Late Middle Japanese, a Japanese linguistic period spanning c. 1200–1600
