= Martine Robbeets =

Belgian linguist (born 1972)

- Born: Martine Irma Robbeets; 24 October 1972 (age 53); Bruges, Belgium
- Occupation: Linguist

Academic background
- Education: Leiden University

Academic work
- Institutions: Max Planck Institute for the Science of Human History and University of Mainz
- Main interests: Historical linguistics
- Notable ideas: Transeurasian languages hypothesis

Martine Irma Robbeets (born 24 October 1972) is a Belgian comparative linguist and Japanologist. She is known for the Transeurasian languages hypothesis, which groups the Japonic, Koreanic, Tungusic, Mongolic, and Turkic languages together into a single language family.

== Education ==
Robbeets received a Ph.D. in Comparative Linguistics from Leiden University, and also received a master's degree in Korean studies from Leiden University. She also holds a master's degree in Japanese studies from KU Leuven.

== Career and research ==
In addition to being a lecturer at the University of Mainz, she is also a group leader at the Max Planck Institute for the Science of Human History in Jena, Germany.

In 2017, Robbeets proposed that Japanese (and possibly Korean) originated as a hybrid language. She proposed that the ancestral home of the Turkic, Mongolic, and Tungusic languages was somewhere in northwestern Manchuria. A group of those proto-Altaic ("Transeurasian") speakers would have migrated south into the modern Liaoning province, where they would have been mostly assimilated by an agricultural community with an Austronesian-like language. The fusion of the two languages would have resulted in proto-Japanese and proto-Korean.

In 2018, Robbeets and Bouckaert used Bayesian phylolinguistic methods to argue for the coherence of the Altaic languages, which they refer to as the Transeurasian languages.

== Personal life ==
Robbeets has a husband, Marc, and a son, Yasu.

== Selected works ==
- Robbeets, M.; Savelyev, A. (eds.): The Oxford Guide to the Transeurasian Languages. Oxford University Press, Oxford (2020)
- Robbeets, M.; Savelyev, A.: Language dispersal beyond farming. John Benjamins Publishing, Amsterdam (2017)
- Robbeets, M.: Diachrony of verb morphology: Japanese and the Transeurasian languages. de Gruyter Mouton, Berlin (2015)
- Robbeets, M.; Bisang, W. (eds.): Paradigm change: in the Transeurasian languages and beyond. Benjamins, Amsterdam (2014)
- Robbeets, M.: Is Japanese related to Korean, Tungusic, Mongolic and Turkic? Harrassowitz, Wiesbaden (2005)
