= Lars Johanson =

Swedish Turcologist and linguist (1936–2025)

- Born: 8 March 1936; Köping, Sweden
- Died: 24 November 2025 (aged 89)
- Occupation: Linguist

Academic background
- Education: University of Uppsala

Academic work
- Institutions: University of Mainz
- Main interests: Turkic languages

Lars Johanson (8 March 1936 – 24 November 2025) was a Swedish Turcologist and linguist, who was professor at the University of Mainz, and docent at the Department of Linguistics and Philology, University of Uppsala, Sweden. He was married to Éva Á. Csató prof. em. Uppsala University.

Johanson was instrumental in transforming the field of Turcology, which was traditionally more philologically oriented, into a linguistic discipline. Apart from his contributions to Turcology, Lars Johanson made a number of pioneering contributions to general linguistics and language typology, in particular to the typology of tense and aspect systems and the theory of language contact.

== Early life and Studies ==
Johanson was born in Köping, Sweden on 8 March 1936. In 1956–1959, he studied German and Scandinavian languages, Sanskrit and Turcology at the University of Uppsala. In 1961, he took an MA exam in German, Scandinavian languages and Slavic Languages at the same university and in 1963 in Turkic languages. In 1966, he took a doctoral degree ("filosofie licentiat") in Turkic Languages at the University of Uppsala with a thesis "Studien zur reichstürkischen Verbalsyntax".

== Professional career ==
- In 1971, he successfully obtained his degree of 'Habilitation' at the University of Uppsala, based on his thesis '"Aspekt im Türkischen"' .
- 1972-1973 Alexander von Humboldt Research Fellow at the University of Mainz
- 1973 Habilitation (with the title “Professor”) in Turcology at the University of Mainz
- In 1981, he was appointed professor in Turcology at the Johannes Gutenberg University of Mainz.

He was invited as a visiting professor to several universities and research institutes:

- 1997–1998 ILCAA, Tokyo University of Foreign Studies
- 2001 Fellow at the Swedish Collegium for Advanced Study, Uppsala, Sweden
- 2001 Research Centre for Linguistic Typology, La Trobe University, Melbourne
- 2002 Sonderforschungsbereich 295 of the Deutsche Forschungsgemeinschaft, University of Hamburg
- 2002 Max Planck Institute for Evolutionary Anthropology, Leipzig
- 2003–2004 guest professor at Boğaziçi University, Istanbul
- 2006 Fellow at the Swedish Collegium for Advanced Study, Uppsala, Sweden
- 2006 Kyoto University, Japan
- 2006 Yakutsk Academy of Sciences, Yakutsk
- 2008–2018 Central University of Nationalities, Beijing (Minzu) Minzu University of China
- 2008 University of Szeged, Hungary
- 2009–2010 General Linguistics at the University of Zürich University of Zurich

Several Festschriften have been dedicated to Lars Johanson:

- 1996 Berta, Árpád, Brendemoen, Bernt and Schönig, Claus (eds.) Symbolae Turcologicae: Studies in honour of Lars Johanson on his sixtieth birthday 8 March
- 1996. Stockholm : Swedish Research Institute in Istanbul (Transactions 6.) Stockholm: Almqvist & Wiksell International.
- 2002 Demir, Nurettin & Turan, Fikret (eds.) Scholarly depth and accuracy. A festschrift to Lars Johanson. Ankara. ISBN 975-93344-3-7.
- 2010 Boeschoten, Hendrik and Rentzsch, Julian (eds.) Turcology in Mainz. (Turcologica 82.) Wiesbaden: Harrassowitz. ISBN 978-3-447-06113-1.
- 2011 Robbeets, Martine and Cuyckens, Robert (eds.) Shared Grammaticalization. With special focus on the Transeurasian Languages. (Studies in Language Companion Series 132.) Amsterdam & Philadelphia: John Benjamins - catalog/books/slcs.132/main.

== Memberships ==
He was a member of the "Permanent International Altaistic Conference", "Wissenschaftliche Gesellschaft an der Universität Frankfurt", Honorary Member of the "Kőrösi Csoma Society", Budapest , Societas Uralo-Altaica, the Royal Society of Arts and Sciences of Uppsala and Honorary Member of the Central Eurasian Studies Society (CESS) Central Eurasian Studies Society.

== Death ==
Johanson died on 24 November 2025, at the age of 89.

== Awards ==
- 1988 Research Award of the Turkish Language Association Turkish Language Association
- 1999 Doctor honoris causa of the University of Szeged
- 2004 Turkic World, Turkic Languages Order of Merit (Türk Dünyası Türk Dili Şeref Ödülü), Türk Kültürüne Hizmet Vakfı
- 2008 Order of Merits of the Republic of Turkey (tr:Türkiye Cumhuriyeti Liyakat Nişan) Order of Merit of the Republic of Turkey

== Publications ==
Between 1966 and 2022, he published about 400 titles, books and scholarly articles. His most important books are Aspekt im Türkischen ('Viewpoint aspect' in Turkish), published in 1971, and Structural factors in Turkic language contacts, published in 2002, and his recent publication, Turkic (Cambridge University Press 2021), constitutes a monumental thousand-page survey of all the Turkic languages in their synchronic, diachronic, typological, areal and cultural dimensions. He is Editor-in-Chief of the Encyclopedia of Turkic Languages and Linguistics published online in 2022 by Brill. In 2022, he and Éva Á. Csató published the second revised edition of the standard reference book The Turkic Languages (Routledge). He had numerous publications on Turkish literature.

- 1971. Aspekt im Türkischen. Vorstudien zu einer Beschreibung des türkeitürkischen Aspektsystems. Studia Turcica Upsaliensia 1. Uppsala: Almqvist & Wiksell. OCLC 462515544
- 1979. Alttürkisch als ‘dissimilierende Sprache’. Abhandlungen der Akademie der Wissenschaften und der Literatur, Mainz, Geistes- und sozialwissenschaftliche Klasse, 1979: 3. Wiesbaden: Steiner. ISBN 3515029559
- 1981. Pluralsuffixe im Südwesttürkischen.Abhandlungen der Akademie der Wissenschaften und der Literatur, Mainz, Geistes- und sozialwissenschaftliche Klasse, 1981: 9. Wiesbaden: Steiner. ISBN 3515035745
- 1991. Linguistische Beiträge zur Gesamturkologie. Budapest: Akadémiai Kiadó. ISBN 963 05 6044 5
- 1992. Strukturelle Faktoren in türkischen Sprachkontakten. Sitzungsberichte der Wissenschaftlichen Gesellschaft an der J. W. Goethe-Universität Frankfurt am Main, 29:5. Stuttgart: Steiner. ISSN 0931-9484
- 1998. with Csató, Éva Á. (eds.) The Turkic Languages. London: Routledge. ISBN 0-415-08200-5 Second edition 2006 ISBN 9780415412612
- 2001. Discoveries on the Turkic linguistic map. (Swedish Research Institute in Istanbul, Publications 5.) Stockholm: Swedish Research Institute in Istanbul. ISBN 9186884107
- 2002. Structural factors in Turkic language contacts. [With an introduction by Bernard Comrie.] London: Curzon. ISBN 0-7007-1182-1
- 2010. with Robbeets, Martine (eds.) Transeurasian verbal morphology in a comparative perspective: genealogy, contact, chance. (Turcologica 78.) Wiesbaden: Harrassowitz. ISBN 978-3-447-05914-5
- 2012 with Robbeets, Martine (eds.) Copies versus cognates in bound morphology. (Brill's Studies in Language, Cognition and Culture 2.) Leiden: Brill. ISBN 978 90 04 22407 0
- 2016 with Éva Á. Csató et al. (eds.) Turks and Iranians: Interactions in Language and History. The Gunnar Jarring Memorial Program at The Swedish Collegium for Advanced Study. (Turcologica 105.) Wiesbaden: Harrassowitz. ISSN 0177-4743, ISBN 978-3-447-10537-8
- 2021 Turkic. Cambridge Language Surveys. Cambridge: Cambridge University Press.url=https://www.cambridge.org/core/books/abs/turkic/turkic/BA55DA05FCE5E798C74FF36802C5CBC2
- 2022 The Turkic Languages 2nd revised edition. London and New York: Routledge.url=https://www.routledge.com/The-Turkic-Languages/Johanson-Csato/p/book/9781032153704
- 2023 Code Copying. The Strength of Languages in Take-over and Carry-over Roles (Brill's Studies in Language, Cognition and Culture 38). Leiden: Brill. url=https://brill.com/display/title/65039 ISBN 978-90-04-54843-5, 978-90-04-54845-9
- 2023 Aspect in the Languages of Europe Ankara: Nobel. ISBN 978-625-397-178-6, 978-625-397-169-4
- 2023 (Editor-in-Chief) Encyclopedia of Turkic Languages and Linguistics Online. Leiden: Brill. url=https://brill.com/search?q1=Encyclopedia+of+Turkic+Languages+and+Linguistics+Online
- 2024 Om min penna ägde kraften … En blick tillbaka på turkisk litteratur och kultur [If my pen had the power ... Looking back on Turkish Literature and Culture]. Stockholm: Swedish Research Institute in Istanbul. ISBN 978-91-8984020-1 url=https://srii.bokorder.se/tr-TR/article/5014/om-min-penna-agde-kraften
- 2025. with Éva Á. Csató Lingua Turcica Agemica. The Gospels of Matthew and John in Middle Azeri from 17th Century Isfahan. Wiesbaden: Harrassowitz. ISBN 978-3-447-12400-3 url=https://www.harrassowitz-verlag.de/title_8496.ahtml

== Sources ==
- Sumru A. Özsoy 2025. In Memory of Prof. Dr. Dr. h.c. Lars Johanson, LINGUIST List 36.3837 Mon Dec 15 2025
- András Róna-Tas 2026.In memoriam Lars Johanson (1936–2025). Acta Orientalia Hungarica 79, 1–2.
- Jankowski, Henryk 2026. In memoriam Lars Johanson (1936–2025). Rocznik Orientalistyczny 79, 176–180
- Demir, Nurettin 2026. Lars Johanson’un ardından bir değerlendirme ve iki başyapıtı An assessment of Lars Johanson and two of his masterpieces. Dil Araştırmaları 38, 325–332.
- Tazhibaeva, Saule & Nevskaya, Irina 2026. Ларс Йохансонның түркітану салаcындағы іргелі теориялық тұжырымдамалары [Fundamental theoretical ideas of Lars Johanson in Turkic studies. Turkish Studies Journal 2, 242–262.
- Abish, Aynur Профессор, доктор, доктор honoris causa ларс юханссонды еске алу: түркологиядағы ғылыми мұрасы Remembering Prof. Dr. Dr. h.c. Lars Johanson: His scholarly legacy in Turkic linguistics. Eurasian Journal of Philology: Science and Education. 201/1, 50–58.
