= Lunda =

Lu(u)nda or Ruund may refer to:

== Places ==
- Lunda (Asia Minor), an Ancient Roman city and present Catholic titular see
- Lunda, Färingsö parish, a locality in Ekerö Municipality, Stockholm County, Sweden
- Lunda, Ohio, an unincorporated community in Liberty Township, Union County, Ohio, United States
- Lunda Sharif, a town in Dera Ismail Khan District, Khyber Pakhtunkhwa, Pakistan

=== Africa ===
- Kingdom of Lunda, a pre-colonial African confederation of states in what is now the Democratic Republic of Congo, Angola and Zambia
- Lunda Norte Province, Angola
- Lunda Sul Province, Angola
- Kasongo Lunda, a town in Kwango District, Bandundu Province, the Democratic Republic of the Congo
- Mission sui iuris of Lunda, a Roman Catholic mission sui iuris (primary pre-diocesan missionary jurisdiction) in Angola from 1900 to 1940

== Ethnography ==
- Lunda people, a group living in the Democratic Republic of Congo, Angola and Zambia
  - Eastern Lunda, a group living in the Democratic Republic of Congo and Zambia
  - Kanongesha-Lunda people or Western Lunda, a group living mainly in the North-Western Province of Zambia
- Lunda languages, a family of Bantu languages
  - Lunda language, spoken in the Democratic Republic of Congo, Angola, and Zambia
  - Ruund language or Northern Lunda language, spoken in the Democratic Republic of the Congo and Angola
  - Salampasu language, spoken in the Democratic Republic of Congo

== Other uses ==
- Elena Lunda (1901–1947), Italian actress
- Lunda, a proposed bird genus including the tufted puffin
- Lunda rope squirrel, a species of rodent found in the Democratic Republic of the Congo and Angola
