= Pitch-accent language =

Language that uses pitch changes for accent

A pitch-accent language is a type of language in which some syllables or morphemes in words are more prominent when spoken due to a distinct contrasting pitch (linguistic tone). Languages that have been described as pitch-accent languages include: most dialects of Serbo-Croatian, Slovene, Baltic languages, Ancient Greek, Vedic Sanskrit, Tlingit, Turkish, Japanese, Limburgish, Norwegian, Swedish, Western Basque, Yaqui, certain dialects of Korean, Shanghainese, and Livonian.

Pitch variation is distinct from emphasis on parts of words by increasing their volume or length, as can happen in other languages including English. Pitch-accent languages also differ from fully tonal languages like Vietnamese and Standard Chinese, in which most syllables have an independent tone. However, some linguists claim that is no unifying definition of pitch-accent languages, and that stress and tone are also important features of the prosody of such languages, to different degrees.

Pitch-accent languages tend to fall into two categories. The first category of languages have a single pitch contour on the accented syllable (for example, high, or high–low), and include Tokyo Japanese, Western Basque, and Persian. The second category contains languages where more than one pitch contour can occur on the accented syllable, and the accented syllable is often stressed another way; these include Punjabi, Swedish, and Serbo-Croatian.

Some of the languages considered pitch-accent languages, in addition to accented words, also have accentless words (e.g., Japanese and Western Basque); in others all major words are accented (e.g., Blackfoot and Barasana).

The term "pitch accent" is also used to denote a different feature, namely the use of pitch when speaking to give selective prominence (accent) to a syllable or mora within a phrase.

== Characteristics of pitch-accent languages ==
=== Definitions ===
Scholars give various definitions of a pitch-accent language. A typical definition is as follows: "Pitch-accent systems [are] systems in which one syllable is more prominent than the other syllables in the same word, a prominence that is achieved by means of pitch" (Zanten & Dol 2010, p. 120). That is to say, in a pitch-accent language, in order to indicate how a word is pronounced it is necessary, as with a stress-accent language, to mark only one syllable in a word as accented, not specify the tone of every syllable. This feature of having only one prominent syllable in a word or morpheme is known as culminativity.

Another property suggested for pitch-accent languages to distinguish them from stress languages is that "Pitch accent languages must satisfy the criterion of having invariant tonal contours on accented syllables ... This is not so for pure stress languages, where the tonal contours of stressed syllables can vary freely" (Hayes 1995, p. 50). Although this is true of many pitch-accent languages, there are others, such as the Franconian dialects, in which the contours vary, for example between declarative and interrogative sentences.

According to another proposal, pitch-accent languages can only use F0 (i.e., pitch) to mark the accented syllable, whereas stress languages may also use duration and intensity (Beckman 1986). However, other scholars disagree, and find that intensity and duration can also play a part in the accent of pitch-accent languages (Levi 2005).

A feature considered characteristic of stress-accent languages is that a stress-accent is obligatory, that is, that every major word has to have an accent. This is not always true of pitch-accent languages, some of which, like Japanese and Northern Bizkaian Basque, have accentless words. But there are also some pitch-accent languages in which every word has an accent.

One feature shared between pitch-accent languages and stress-accent languages is demarcativeness: prominence peaks tend to occur at or near morpheme edges (word/stem initial, word/stem penult, word/stem final).

Often, however, the difference between a pitch-accent language, a stress-accent language, and tonal language is not clear. "It is, in fact, often not straightforward to decide whether a particular pitch system is best described as tonal or accentual. ... Since raised pitch, especially when it coincides with vowel length, makes a syllable perceptually more prominent, it can often require detailed phonetic and phonological analysis to disentangle whether pitch is playing a more stress-like or a more tone-like role in a particular language" (Downing 2010, p. 382).

Hyman (2009) argues that tone is made up of a variety of different typological features, which can be mixed and matched with some independence from each other. Hyman claims that there can be no coherent definition of pitch-accent, as the term describes languages that have non-prototypical combinations of tone system properties (or both a tone system, usually still non-prototypical, and a stress system simultaneously). Since all pitch-accent languages can be analysed just as well in purely tonal terms, in Hyman's view, the term "pitch-accent" should be superseded by a wider understanding of what qualifies as a tone system - thus, all "pitch-accent" languages are tone languages, and there is simply more variety within tone systems than has historically been admitted.

=== Characteristics of the accent ===
==== High vs. low accent ====
When one particular tone is marked in a language in contrast to unmarked syllables, it is usual for it to be a high tone. There are, however, a few languages in which the marked tone is a low tone, for example the Dogrib language of northwestern Canada, the Kansai dialect of Japanese, and certain Bantu languages of the Congo such as Ciluba and Ruund.

==== Disyllabic accents ====
One difference between a pitch accent and a stress accent is that it is not uncommon for a pitch accent to be realised over two syllables. Thus in Serbo-Croatian, the difference between a "rising" and a "falling" accent is observed only in the pitch of the syllable following the accent: the accent is said to be "rising" if the following syllable is as high as or higher than the accented syllable, but "falling" if it is lower (see Serbo-Croatian phonology#Pitch accent).

In Vedic Sanskrit, the ancient Indian grammarians described the accent as being a high pitch (udātta) followed by a falling tone (svarita) on the following syllable; but occasionally, when two syllables had merged, the high tone and the falling tone were combined on one syllable.

In Standard Swedish, the difference between accent 1 and accent 2 can only be heard in words of two or more syllables, since the tones take two syllables to be realised. In Värmland as well as Norrland accent 1 and 2 can be heard in monosyllabic words however. In the central Swedish dialect of Stockholm, citation forms of words with accent 1 have a LHL contour and a HLHL contour when marked with accent 2, with an additional peak in the second syllable.

In Welsh, in most words the accent is realised as a low tone on the penultimate syllable (which is also stressed) followed by a high tone on the final; but in some dialects this LH contour may take place entirely within the penultimate syllable.

Similarly in the Chichewa language of Malawi a tone on a final syllable often spreads backwards to the penultimate syllable, so that the word Chichewá is actually pronounced Chichēwā with two mid-tones, or Chichěwā, with a rising tone on the penultimate syllable. Sentence-finally it can become Chichěwà with a rising tone on the penultimate and a low tone on the final.

==== Peak delay ====
A phenomenon observed in a number of languages, both fully tonal ones and those with pitch-accent systems, is peak delay. In this, the high point (peak) of a high tone does not synchronise exactly with the syllable itself, but is reached at the beginning of the following syllable, giving the impression that the high tone has spread over two syllables. The Vedic Sanskrit accent described above has been interpreted as an example of peak delay.

==== One-mora accents ====
Conversely, a pitch accent in some languages can target just part of a syllable, if the syllable is bi-moraic. Thus in Luganda, in the word Abagânda "Baganda people" the accent is considered to occur on the first mora of the syllable ga(n), but in Bugáńda "Buganda (region)" it occurs on the second half (with spreading back to the first half). In Ancient Greek, similarly, in the word οἶκοι (oîkoi) "houses" the accent is on the first half of the syllable oi, but in οἴκοι (oíkoi) "at home" on the second half. An alternative analysis is to see Luganda and Ancient Greek as belonging to the type of languages where there is a choice of different contours on an accented syllable.

=== High tone spread ===
==== Anticipation ====
In some pitch-accent languages, the high pitch of the accent can be anticipated in the preceding syllable or syllables, for example, Japanese atámá ga "head", Basque lagúnén amúma "the friend's grandmother", Turkish sínírlénmeyecektiniz "you would not get angry", Belgrade Serbian pápríka "pepper", Ancient Greek ápáítéì "it demands".

==== Forwards spreading ====
Forwards spreading of a tone is also common in some languages. For example, in the Northern Ndebele language of Zimbabwe, the tonal accent on the prefix ú- spreads forward to all the syllables in the word except the last two: úkúhleka "to laugh"; úkúhlékísana "to make one another laugh". Sometimes the sequence HHHH then becomes LLLH, so that in the related language Zulu, the equivalent of these words is ukúhleka and ukuhlekísana with an accent shifted to the antepenultimate syllable.

In Yaqui, the accent is signalled by an upstep before the accented syllable. The high pitch continues after the accent, declining slightly, until the next accented syllable. Thus it is the opposite of Japanese, where the accent is preceded by high pitch, and its position is signalled by a downstep after the accented syllable.

==== Plateau between accents ====
In other languages the high pitch of an accent, instead of dropping to a low on the following syllable, in some circumstances can continue in a plateau to the next accented syllable, as in Luganda kírí mú Búgáńda "it is in Buganda" (contrast kíri mu Bunyóró "it is in Bunyoro", in which Bunyóró is unaccented apart from automatic default tones).

Plateauing is also found in Chichewa, where in some circumstances a sequence of HLH can change to HHH. For example, ndí + njingá "with a bicycle" makes ndí njíngá with a plateau.

In Western Basque and Luganda, the default high tones automatically added to accentless words can spread in a continuous plateau through the phrase as far as the first accent, for example, in Basque Jonén lágúnén ámúma "John's friend's grandmother", Luganda abántú mú kíbúga "people in the city".

=== Simple pitch-accent languages ===
According to the first two criteria above, the Tokyo dialect of Japanese is often considered a typical pitch-accent language, since the pronunciation of any word can be specified by marking just one syllable as accented, and in every word the accent is realised by a fall in pitch immediately after the accented syllable. In the examples below the accented syllable is marked in bold (the particle ga indicates that the word is subject):

- m**á**kura ga "pillow"
- an**á**ta ga "you"
- atám**á** ga "head"
- sakáná gá "fish" (unaccented)

In Japanese there are also other high-toned syllables, which are added to the word automatically, but these do not count as accents, since they are not followed by a low syllable. As can be seen, some of the words in Japanese have no accent.

In Proto-Indo-European and its descendant, Vedic Sanskrit, the system is comparable to Tokyo Japanese and Cupeño in most respects, specifying pronunciation through inherently accented morphemes such as *-ró- and *-tó- (Vedic -rá- and -tá-) and inherently unaccented morphemes. The examples below demonstrate the formation of such words using morphemes:

- PIE */h_{2}erǵ-ró-(o)s/ > *h_{2}r̥ǵrós "shining" (Vedic r̥jrás)
- PIE */ḱlew-tó-(o)s/ > *ḱlutós "heard (of), famous" (Vedic śrutás)

If there are multiple accented morphemes, the accent is determined by specific morphophonological principles. Below is a comparison of Vedic, Tokyo Japanese and Cupeño regarding accent placement:

- Vedic /gáv-ā́/ > gáv-ā "with the cow"
- Japanese /yón-dára/ > yón-dara "if (he) reads"
- Cupeño /ʔáyu-qá/ > ʔáyu-qa "(he) wants"

The Basque language has a system very similar to Japanese. In some Basque dialects, as in Tokyo Japanese, there are accented and unaccented words; in other dialects all major words have an accent. As with Japanese, the accent in Basque consists of a high pitch followed by a fall on the next syllable.

Turkish is another language often considered a pitch-accent language (see Turkish phonology#Word-accent). In some circumstances, for example in the second half of a compound, the accent can disappear.

Persian has also been called a pitch-accent language in recent studies, although the high tone of the accent is also accompanied by stress; and as with Turkish, in some circumstances the accent can be neutralised and disappear. Because the accent is both stressed and high-pitched, Persian can be considered intermediate between a pitch-accent language and a stress-accent language.

=== More complex pitch accents ===
In some simple pitch-accent languages, such as Ancient Greek, the accent on a long vowel or diphthong could be on either half of the vowel, making a contrast possible between a rising accent and a falling one; compare οἴκοι (oíkoi) "at home" vs. οἶκοι (oîkoi) "houses". Similarly in Luganda, in bimoraic syllables a contrast is possible between a level and falling accent: Bugáńda "Buganda (region)", vs. Abagânda "Baganda (people)". However, such contrasts are not common or systematic in these languages.

In more complex types of pitch-accent languages, although there is still only one accent per word, there is a systematic contrast of more than one pitch-contour on the accented syllable, for example, H vs. HL in the Colombian language Barasana, accent 1 vs. accent 2 in Swedish and Norwegian, rising vs. falling tone in Serbo-Croatian, and a choice between level (neutral), rising, and falling in Punjabi.

Other languages deviate from a simple pitch accent in more complicated ways. For example, in describing the Osaka dialect of Japanese, it is necessary to specify not only which syllable of a word is accented, but also whether the initial syllable of the word is high or low.

In Luganda the accented syllable is usually followed immediately after the HL of the accent by an automatic default tone, slightly lower than the tone of the accent, e.g., túgendá "we are going"; however, there are some words such as bálilabá "they will see", where the automatic default tone does not follow the accent immediately but after an interval of two or three syllables. In such words it is therefore necessary to specify not only which syllable has the accent, but where the default tone begins.

Because of the number of ways languages can use tone, some linguists, such as the tonal languages specialist Larry Hyman, argue that the category "pitch-accent language" can have no coherent definition, and that all such languages should simply be referred to as "tonal languages".

== Languages ==
=== Proto-Indo-European ===
The theoretical proto-language Proto-Indo-European, the putative ancestor of most European, Iranian and North Indian languages, is usually reconstructed to have been a free pitch-accent system. ("Free" here refers to the position of the accent since its position was unpredictable by phonological rules and so could be on any syllable of a word, regardless of its structure.) From comparisons with the surviving Indo-European daughter languages, it is generally believed that the accented syllable was higher in pitch than the surrounding syllables. Among daughter languages, a pitch-accent system is found in Vedic Sanskrit, Ancient Greek, the Baltic languages and some South Slavic languages, although none of them preserves the original system intact.

=== Vedic Sanskrit ===
Vedic Sanskrit, the earliest form of the Indian language Sanskrit, is believed to have had a pitch accent that was very similar to that of its ancestor language Proto-Indo-European. Most words had exactly one accented syllable, but there were some unaccented words, such as finite verbs of main clauses, non-initial vocatives, and certain pronouns and particles. Occasionally, a compound word occurred with two accents: ápa-bhartávai "to take away".

The ancient Indian grammarians describe the accented syllable as being "raised" (udātta), and it appears that it was followed in the following syllable by a downwards glide, which the grammarians refer to as "sounded" (svarita). In some cases, language change merged an accented syllable with a following svarita syllable, and the two were combined in a single syllable, known as "independent svarita".

The precise descriptions of ancient Indian grammarians imply that the udātta was characterised by rising pitch and the svarita by falling pitch. In the tradition represented by the Rigveda, a collection of hymns, the highest point of the accent appears not to have been reached until the beginning of the svarita syllable. In other words, it was an example of "peak delay" (see above).

In the later stages of Sanskrit, the pitch accent was lost and a stress accent remained. The stress in Sanskrit, however, was weaker than that in English and not free but predictable. The stress was heard on the penultimate syllable of the word if it was heavy, on the antepenultimate if the antepenultimate was heavy and the penultimate light, and otherwise on the pre-antepenultimate.

=== Ancient Greek ===
In Ancient Greek, one of the final three syllables of a word carried an accent. Each syllable contained one or two vocalic morae, but only one can be accented, and accented morae were pronounced at a higher pitch. In polytonic orthography, accented vowels were marked with the acute accent. Long vowels and diphthongs are thought to have been bimoraic and, if the accent falls on the first mora, were marked with the circumflex. Long vowels and diphthongs that were accented on the first mora had a high–low (falling) pitch contour and, if accented on the second mora, may have had a low–high (rising) pitch contour:

γάλα
[ɡála]
"milk"
short accented vowel
γῆ
[ɡɛ́͜ɛ]
"earth"
long vowel accented on the first mora
ἐγώ
[eɡɔ͜ɔ́]
"I"
long vowel accented on the second mora

recording of γάλα, γῆ, ἐγώ

The Ancient Greek accent was melodic, as is suggested by descriptions by ancient grammarians but also by fragments of Greek music such as the Seikilos epitaph, in which most words are set to music that coincides with the accent. For example, the first syllable of the word φαίνου (phaínou) is set to three notes rising in pitch, the middle syllable of ὀλίγον (olígon) is higher in pitch than the other two syllables, and the circumflex accent of ζῆν (zên) has two notes, the first a third higher than the second.

In addition to the two accents mentioned above (the acute and the circumflex), Ancient Greek also had a grave accent. It was used only on the last syllable of words, as an alternative to an acute. The acute was used when the word was cited in isolation or came before a pause, such as a comma or a full stop, or an enclitic. Otherwise, a grave was written. The exact interpretation of the grave is disputed: it may have indicated that the accent was completely suppressed or that it was partly suppressed but not entirely absent.

By comparing the position of the Ancient Greek and Vedic Sanskrit accents, the accent of the ancestor language Proto-Indo-European can often be reconstructed. For example, in the declension of the word for "father" in these two languages, the position of the accent in some cases is identical:

Case	Ancient Greek	Vedic Sanskrit
Nominative sg.	πατήρ (patḗr)	pitā
Vocative sg.	πάτερ (páter)	pitar
Accusative sg.	πατέρα (patéra)	pitaram
Dative sg.	πατρί (patrí)	pitrē
Dative pl.	πατράσι (patrási)	pitrsu (locative)

In later stages of Greek, the accent changed from a pitch accent to a stress accent, but remained largely on the same syllable as in Ancient Greek. The change is thought to have taken place by the 4th century AD. Thus, the word ἄνθρωπος (ánthrōpos) ("man, person"), which is believed to have been pronounced in ancient times with the first syllable always higher than the other two, is now pronounced with the first syllable either higher or lower than the other two.

=== Baltic languages ===
Two languages of the Baltic branch of the Indo-European family survive today: Lithuanian and Latvian. (Another Baltic language, Old Prussian, died out in the 18th century.) Both languages have a tonal accent that is believed to derive from the ancestral Proto-Indo-European language.

Possible relationships between Baltic tones

Baltic tones are often classified as either "acute" or "circumflex". However, these labels indicate a diachronic correspondence rather than a phonetic one. For example, the "acute" accent is falling in Lithuanian but a high level tone in Latvian and is presumed to have been rising in Old Prussian and Classical Greek. The "circumflex" is rising in Lithuanian but falling in Latvian, Prussian and Classical Greek.

In the tree diagram on the right, as adopted from Poljakov, names for (original) Baltic tones have been equated with those of modern Standard Lithuanian and the falling tone in Latvian is depicted as derived from a Baltic rising tone. According to some it was Lithuanian that "switched the places" of the Baltic tones. This might explain why most languages call a rising tone "acute" while in Baltic terminology a falling tone is "acute". Some controversy surrounds Poljakov's model, and it has been harshly criticized by Frederik Kortlandt. Kortlandt contends that broken tone in Latvian and Žemaitian is a reflex of a now disappeared glottal stop in Balto-Slavic not preserved in Aukštaitian (Standard Lithuanian) or Slavic languages and not a recent development of acute.

==== Lithuanian ====
Long segments in Lithuanian can take one of two accents: rising or falling. "Long segments" are defined as either long vowels, diphthongs or a sequence of a vowel followed by a sonorant if they are in a stressed position. Pitch can serve as the only distinguishing characteristic for minimal pairs that are otherwise orthographically identical, e.g., kar̃tų 'time:gen.pl' vs. kártų 'hang:irr.3' (rising and falling tone indicated by a tilde and an acute accent respectively.)

==== Latvian ====
In Latvian, long segments (the same criteria as in Lithuanian) can take on one of three pitches (intonācijas or more specifically zilbes intonācijas) either stiepta ("level"), lauzta ("broken") or krītoša ("falling") indicated by Latvian linguists with a tilde, circumflex or a grave accent respectively (in IPA, however, the tilde is replaced by a macron because the former is already reserved to denote nasalized vowels.) Some authors note that the level pitch is realized simply as "ultra long" (or overlong.) Endzelīns (1897) identifies "level diphthongs" as consisting of 3 moras not just two. Broken pitch is, in turn, a falling pitch with superadded glottalization. And, indeed, the similarity between the Latvian broken pitch and Danish stød has been described by several authors. At least in Danish phonology, stød (unlike Norwegian and Swedish pitch accents) is not considered a pitch accent distinction but, rather, variously described as either glottalization, laryngealization, creaky voice or vocal fry. Some authors point out that the so-called broken pitch is not a pitch accent but a pitch register distinction similar to the ngã register of Northern Vietnamese.

Outside of Central Vidzeme (Standard Latvian), the three-way system has been simplified, in Eastern Latvian (Latgale) only broken and falling pitches are distinguished. Speakers of Riga Latvian and other more westward varieties differentiate only between level and broken pitches with the falling pitch being merged with the broken one. Thus the Standard Latvian "minimal triplet" or "minimal set" of [zāːle] (hall), [zâːle] (grass) and [zàːles] (medicine) in Rīga Latvian would be reduced to "hall" (level pitch) and "grass" (broken pitch) and "medicine" would be pronounced with a broken pitch just like "grass". Speakers around Ērgļi tend to have just levelled pitch.

==== Livonian ====
Livonian is a Finnic language rather than Baltic but was influenced by Latvian. In the late 19th century, Danish linguist Vilhelm Thomsen identified a characteristic in the speech of a Livonian sailor that to him seemed very similar to the Danish stød. The feature was later the subject of research by several Finno-Ugricists. Although the (Indo-European) Latvian and (Uralic) Livonian are phylogenetically unrelated (being from different language families) both have influenced each other heavily in terms of phonology. Whether Livonian acquired this feature from Latvian or vice versa is debated; however, as Livonian is the only Finno-Ugric language to have this feature, the majority of researchers believe it was a product of Latvian influence on Livonian and not the other way around. It is possible that "Livonian stød" would be classified as a pitch accent only by Latvian classification just like the identical Latvian lauztā intonācija, otherwise it would be considered a pitch register, glottalization or similar categories.

=== Norwegian and Swedish ===
Norwegian and Swedish are stress-accent languages, but in addition to the stress, two-syllable words with the stress on the first syllable in most dialects also have differences in tone. There are two kinds of tonal accent, referred to as the acute and grave accents, but they are also called accent 1 and accent 2 or tone 1 and tone 2. Over 150 two-syllable word pairs are differentiated only by their use of the accent. Tone 1 is used generally for words whose second syllable is the definite article and for words that were monosyllabic in Old Norse.

For example, in most Norwegian dialects, the word bønder (farmers) is pronounced with tone 1, while tone 2 is used when pronouncing bønner (beans or prayers). Differences in spelling occasionally let readers distinguish written words, but most minimal pairs are written alike. An example in Swedish is the word anden, which means "the duck" when using tone 1 and "the spirit" when using tone 2. In some dialects of Swedish, including those spoken in Finland, the distinction is absent. There are significant variations in the realization of pitch accent between dialects. Thus, in most of western and northern Norway (the so-called high-pitch dialects), accent 1 is falling, and accent 2 is rising in the first syllable and falling in the second syllable or somewhere around the syllable boundary; but in most of eastern Norway (the so-called low-pitch dialects), accent 1 uses a low flat pitch in the first syllable, while accent 2 uses a high, sharply falling pitch in the first syllable and a low pitch in the beginning of the second syllable.

The word accents give Norwegian and Swedish a "singing" quality that makes them easy to distinguish from other languages. In Danish (except for some southern dialects), the pitch accent of Swedish and Norwegian corresponds to the glottalization phenomenon known as stød.

=== Rhinelandic dialects ===
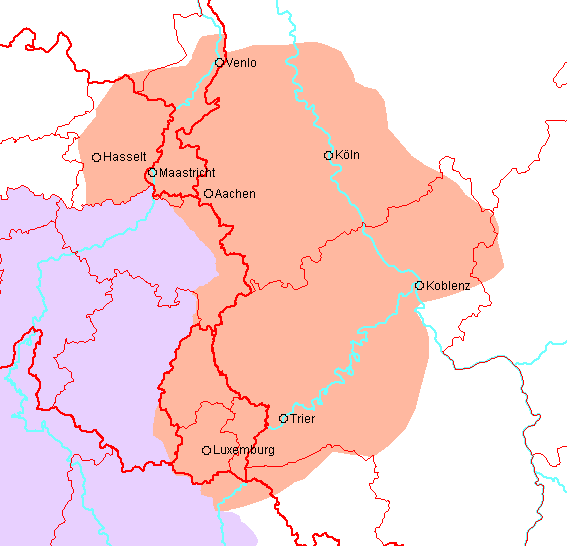
Extent (orange) of pitch usage in Benelux, Germany and France at the beginning of the 20th century

A pitch accent is found in the following Rhinelandic languages or dialects: Limburgish, Ripuarian and Moselle Franconian (excluding Luxembourgish). They are sometimes collectively referred to as West Central German tonal languages.

In these dialects there is a distinction between two different tonal contours, known as "tonal accent 1" and "tonal accent 2". As with Lithuanian, the distinction is made only in stressed syllables and, for the most part, only when the syllable contains a long vowel or diphthong or vowel that is followed in the same syllable by a sonorant (r, l, m, n, ŋ). No distinction of tones is made in stressed syllables containing a short vowel only. Although the accentual system resembles that of Swedish, the two are thought to have arisen independently. Unlike Swedish, where the distinction in tones is not made in monosyllables (except for in northern and western dialects), in the Franconian dialects it very frequently occurs in monosyllables, e.g., (Ripuarian dialect) zɛɪ^{1} "sieve" vs. zɛɪ^{2} "she".

The tonal accents are referred to under a variety of names. Tonal accent 1 is called stoottoon ("thrusting tone") in Dutch or Schärfung in German, while tonal accent 2 is named sleeptoon ("slurring tone") in Dutch and Schleifton in German, apparently referring to the double peak it has in areas such as Limburg. (Note: The corresponding terms for Rhinelandic tone accents are as follows: / Accent 1 (T1) / Accent 2 (T2); e.g. / zɛɪ^{1} 'sieve' / zɛɪ^{2} 'she'; German terms / Schärfung (+Schärfung) / (−Schärfung); German terms / geschärft (+geschärft) / ungeschärft (−geschärft); German terms / Stoßton / Schleifton; Dutch terms / stoottoon / sleeptoon; Dutch terms / hoge toon / valtoon; The Dutch terms hoge toon and valtoon are misnomers for Colognian.)

The two accents have different realisations in different dialects. For example, in Cologne, accent 1 has a sharp fall near the beginning of the syllable, and accent 2 remains level for a while before falling. In Arzbach, near Koblenz, on the other hand, accent 1 rises slightly or remains level, while it is accent 2 that falls sharply, that is, more or less the reverse of the Cologne pattern. In Hasselt in Belgian Limburg, accent 1 rises then falls, and with accent 2 there is a fall and then a rise and another fall. The three types are known as Rule A, Rule B and Rule 0, respectively. Although traditionally accent 2 has been analysed as the marked variant, in certain Rule A areas (especially Cologne, where accent 2's realization is nigh-indistinguishable from an unpitched long vowel) accent 1 is thought of as the marked variant. Grammars of the Cologne dialect will treat the pitches as "ungeschärft" (accent 2) and "geschärft" (accent 1). Adam Wrede (1958)'s influential dictionary of the Cologne dialect also treats accent 2 as indistinct; the above examples zɛɪ^{1} "sieve" and zɛɪ^{2} "she," "they" are transcribed (zeiː) and (zei) respectively; the differing transcriptions of the vowel are due to the pronunciation being different in Cologne than the surrounding dialects.

It has recently been observed that in interrogative sentences, however, all three types have nearly identical intonations. In all dialects in accent 1, there is then a rise and then a fall. In accent 2, there is then a fall, a rise and then another fall.

Since the contour of the accent changes in different contexts, from declarative to interrogative, those dialects apparently contradict Hayes (1995)'s proposed criterion for a pitch-accent language of the contour of a pitch-accent remaining stable in every context.

=== West South Slavic languages ===
The West South Slavic languages include Serbo-Croatian (Bosnian-Croatian-Montenegrin-Serbian) and Slovenian, spoken in the former Yugoslavia.

The late Proto-Slavic accentual system was based on a fundamental opposition of a short/long circumflex (falling) tone, and an acute (rising) tone, the position of the accent being free as was inherited from Proto-Balto-Slavic. Common Slavic accentual innovations significantly reworked the original system primarily with respect to the position of the accent (Dybo's law, Illič-Svityč's law, Meillet's law etc.), and further developments yielded some new accents, such as the so-called neoacute (Ivšić's law), or the new rising tone in Neoštokavian dialects (the so-called "Neoštokavian retraction").

As opposed to other Slavic dialect subgroups, West South Slavic dialects have largely retained the Proto-Slavic system of free and mobile tonal accent (including the dialect used for basis of Modern Standard Slovene and the Neoštokavian dialect used for the basis of standard varieties of Serbo-Croatian: Bosnian, Croatian and Serbian), though the discrepancy between the codified norm and actual speech may vary significantly. (Note: For example the accentual systems of the spoken dialects (completely for Kajkavian, partially for Čakavian) of the Croatian capital Zagreb and the city of Rijeka are stress-based and do not use distinctive vowel length or pitch accent.)

==== Serbo-Croatian ====
The Neoštokavian dialect used for the basis of standard Bosnian, Croatian and Serbian distinguishes four types of pitch accents: short falling (ȅ), short rising (è), long falling (ȇ), and long rising (é). There are also unaccented vowels: long (ē) and short (e). The accent is said to be relatively free, as it can be manifested on any syllable except the last. The long accents are realized by pitch change within the long vowel; the short ones are realized by the pitch difference from the subsequent syllable.

Accent alternations are very frequent in inflectional paradigms by both types of accent and placement in the word (the so-called "mobile paradigms", which were present in the PIE itself but became much more widespread in Proto-Balto-Slavic). Different inflected forms of the same lexeme can exhibit all four accents: lònac 'pot' (nominative sg.), lónca (genitive sg.), lȏnci (nominative pl.), lȍnācā (genitive pl.).

Restrictions on the distribution of the accent depend on the position of the syllable but also on its quality, as not every kind of accent is manifested in every syllable.

1. A falling tone generally occurs in monosyllabic words or the first syllable of a word (pȃs 'belt', rȏg 'horn'; bȁba 'old woman', lȃđa 'river ship'; kȕćica 'small house', Kȃrlovac). The only exception to this rule are the interjections, i.e., words uttered in the state of excitement (ahȁ, ohȏ)
2. A rising tone generally occurs in any syllable of a word except the ultimate and never in monosyllabic words (vòda 'water', lúka 'harbour'; lìvada 'meadow', lúpānje 'slam'; siròta 'female orphan', počétak 'beginning'; crvotòčina 'wormhole', oslobođénje 'liberation').

Thus, monosyllables generally have falling tone, and polysyllabic words generally have falling or rising tone on the first syllable and rising in all the other syllables except the last. The tonal opposition rising vs. falling is generally possible only in the first accented syllable of polysyllabic words, but the opposition by length, long vs. short, is possible even in the nonaccented syllable and the post-accented syllable (but not in the preaccented position).

Proclitics (clitics that latch on to a following word), on the other hand, can "steal" a falling tone (but not a rising tone) from the following monosyllabic or disyllabic words (as seen in the examples /vîdiːm/→/ně‿vidiːm/, /ʒěliːm/→/ne‿ʒěliːm/). The stolen accent is always short and may end up being either falling or rising on the proclitic. That phenomenon is obligatory in Neoštokavian idiom and therefore in all three standard languages, but it is often lost in spoken dialects because of the influence of other dialects (such as in Zagreb because of the influence of Kajkavian dialect).

	in isolation		with proclitic	
rising	/ʒěliːm/	I want	/ne‿ʒěliːm/	I don't want
rising	/nemɔɡǔːtɕnɔːst/	inability	/u‿nemɔɡǔːtɕnɔsti/	not being able to
falling	N: /zǐːma/, A: /zîːmu/	winter	/û‿ziːmu/ (A)	in the winter
falling	/vîdiːm/	I see	/ně‿vidiːm/	I can't see
falling	N, A: /ɡrâːd/	city	/û‿ɡraːd/ (A)	to the city (stays falling)
falling	N: /ʃûma/	forest	/ǔ‿ʃumi/ (L)	in the forest (becomes rising)

==== Slovenian ====
In Slovenian, there are two concurrent standard accentual systems: the older, tonal, with three "pitch accents", and the younger, dynamic (i.e., stress-based), with louder and longer syllables. The stress-based system was introduced because two thirds of Slovenia has lost its tonal accent. In practice, however, even the stress-based accentual system is just an abstract ideal, and speakers generally retain their own dialect even when they try to speak Standard Slovenian. For example, speakers of urban dialects in western Slovenia without distinctive length fail to introduce a quantitative opposition when they speak the standard language.

The older accentual system is tonal and free (jágoda 'strawberry', malína 'raspberry', gospodár 'master, lord'). There are three kinds of accents: short falling (è), long falling (ȇ) and long rising (é). Non-final syllables always have long accents: rakîta 'crustacea', tetíva 'sinew'. The short falling accent is always in the final syllable: bràt 'brother'. Three-way opposition among accents can only then be present: deskà 'board' : blagọ̑ 'goods, ware' : gospá 'lady'. Accent can be mobile throughout the inflectional paradigm: dȃr — darȗ, góra — gorẹ́ — goràm, bràt — bráta — o brȃtu, kráva — krȃv, vóda — vodọ̑ — na vọ̑do). The distinction is made between open -e- and -o- (either long or short) and closed -ẹ- and -ọ- (always long).

=== Emilian ===
The variety of Emilian as spoken in the city of Parma has been described as having a contrast between "simple" and "rising" pitch in accented syllables. Simple pitch originates from historical short stressed vowels, while rising pitch comes from original long vowels, which could only occur in stressed position (and are, in fact, analysed by some to be merely allophonic). In accented syllables where the vowel is followed by a coda sonorant (/l, m, n, r/) before another consonant, the vowel itself has simple pitch, but the combination of said vowel with the sonorant shows either rising or falling pitch.

An orthography was devised by University of Parma professor Guido Michelini to be able to reflect pitch in writing. Vowels with rising or falling pitch are doubled, and an accent mark (grave or acute, to indicate vowel quality) is placed on the first vowel of the two if the pitch is falling, and on the second if the pitch is rising. Vowels with simple tone are written as single, and generally bear the accent mark. To this day, however, this orthographic proposal has not enjoyed widespread use.

Certain words that have rising pitch by default show simple pitch when used as proclitics. For instance, "soóra" ("up", "on top", "upward") can be used as an adverb ("mètla soóra", "put it on top") with rising pitch, or as a preposition ("mètla sóra al dvanseèl", "put it over the windowsill").

Minimal pairs include:

- bòta /bɔ̄ta/ ("barrel"), boòta /bɔ̌ta/ ("hit, strike" n.)
- i còron /i kɔ̄rɔn/ ("they run"), i coòron /i kɔ̌rɔn/ ("the horns")
- mèj /mɛ̄j/ ("mine", feminine plural possessive pronoun), meèj /mɛ̌j/ ("never")
- i dan /i dān/ ("they give"), i daán /i dǎn/ ("the damages")

A potential minimal triplet, which could however be dismissed as simply showing a contrast in prosodic intonation, is:

- dit /dīt/ ("said", masculine sg. and pl.), diìt? /dǐt/ ("do you say?"), dìit /dît/ ("say to yourself")

=== Basque ===
The Basque language of northeastern Spain and southwestern France has a number of different dialects and a number of accentual patterns. Only western varieties seem to have a tonal accent, and eastern varieties have a stress accent (the stress-accent dialects also differ one from another). According to an analysis first suggested by J.R. Hualde, Northern Bizkaian has most nouns accentless in their absolutive singular form, but they have a default high tone (shown by underlining below), which continues throughout the word except for the first syllable. These examples come from the Guernica (Gernika) dialect:

- Gerníké "Guernica"
- basóá "forest"
- patátíé "potato"
- guntsúrrúné "kidney"

There are, however, a few nouns (often borrowings) with a lexical accent. As in Japanese, the accent consists of a high tone, followed by a low one:

- Bílbo "Bilbao"
- apáriže "supper"

In addition, some suffixes (including all plural suffixes) are preaccenting and so cause an accent on the syllable before the suffix:

- ándrak "women"
- txakúrren "of dogs" (genitive plural)
- Gerníkétik "from Guernica"

Other suffixes do not cause any extra accent:

- txakúrrén "of the dog" (genitive singular)

When a preaccenting suffix is added to an already-accented word, only the first accent is retained:

- Bílbotik "from Bilbao"

The accent from Ondarroa is similar but the accent of the word, if any, always appears on the penultimate syllable:

- Bilbótik "from Bilbao" (Ondarroa pronunciation)

Intonation studies show that when an accentless word is spoken either in isolation or before a verb, it acquires an accent on its last syllable (or, in Ondarroa, on its penultimate syllable). However, that is an intonational accent, rather than a lexical accent:

- lagúná etorri da "the friend (laguna) has come"

When an accentless word in those dialects of Basque is followed by an accented word, the automatic high tones continue in a plateau as far as the accent:

- lagúnén ámúma ikusi dot "I have seen the friend's grandmother (amúma)"

That also applies if the accent is intonational. In the following sentence, all words are unaccented apart from the intonational accent before the verb:

- lagúnén álábíá etorri da "the friend's daughter has come"

When an accented word is focused, the pitch of the accented syllable is raised, but if the word is accentless, there is no rise in pitch on that word but only on the accented word. In the following phrase, only the word amúma "grandmother" is thus accented, whether the focus is on "John", "friend", or "grandmother", or none of these:

- Jonén lágúnén ámúma "John's friend's grandmother"

Another pitch accent area in Basque is found in western Navarre, near the border with France in the towns of Goizueta and Leitza. There is a strong stress accent there on the second or the first syllable of every word, like with central dialects of Basque, but there is also a pitch contrast superimposed on the stress: mendik (rise-dip-rise) "the mountain" vs. mendik (rise-fall) "the mountains".

=== Turkish ===
Although the Turkish accent is traditionally referred to as "stress", recent studies have pointed out that the main correlate of lexical accent is actually pitch. In a word like sözcükle "with a word", the accented second syllable is thus higher than the other two but has less intensity (loudness).

Turkish word-accent is found especially in geographical names (İstanbul, Ankara, Yunanistan "Greece", Adana), foreign borrowings (salata "salad", lokanta "restaurant"), some proper names (Erdoğan, Kenedi), compound words (başkent "capital city"), some words referring to relatives (anne "mother"), and certain adverbs (şimdi "now", yalnız "only"). It is also caused by certain suffixes, some of which are "pre-accenting" and so cause an accent on the syllable preceding them, such as negative -me-/-ma-, question particle mi?, or copula -dir "it is" (gelmedi "he did not come", geldi mi? "did he come?", güzeldir "it is beautiful"). The accented syllable is slightly higher in pitch than the following syllable. All other words, when pronounced in isolation, either have a slightly raised pitch on the final syllable or are pronounced with all the syllables level.

Turkish also has a phrase-accent and focus-accent. An accent on the first word of a phrase usually causes an accent in the following words or suffixes to be neutralised, e.g., çoban salatası "shepherd salad", Ankara'dan da "also from Ankara", telefon ettiler "they telephoned", with only one accent.

A controversy exists over whether Turkish has accentless words, like Japanese and Basque. Some scholars, such as Levi (2005) and Özçelik (2016), see the final raised pitch sometimes heard in words such as arkadaş ("friend") or geldi ("he came") as a mere phrasal tone or boundary tone. Others, such as Kabak (2016), prefer the traditional view that the final accent in such words is a kind of stress.

=== Persian ===
The accent of Persian words used to be always referred to as "stress" but is recognised as a pitch accent in recent works. Acoustic studies show that accented syllables have some of the characteristics of stressed syllables in stress-accent languages (slightly more intensity, more length, more open vowels), but that effect is much less than would normally be expected in stress-accent languages. The main difference is one of pitch, with a contour of (L)+H*.

Normally, the pitch falls again at the end of the syllable (if final) or on the next syllable.

Persian nouns and adjectives are always accented on the final syllable. Certain suffixes, such as the plural -ha, shift the accent to themselves:

- ketâb "book"
- ketâb-hâ "books"
- ketâb-i "bookish"

Other suffixes, such as possessives and the indefinite -i, are clitic and so are unaccented:

- ketâb-etun "your book"
- ketâb-i "a book"

In verbs, the personal endings in the past tense are clitic but are accented in the future tense:

- gereft-am "I took"
- gerefte-am "I have taken"
- xâham gereft "I will take"

When prefixes are added, the accent shifts to the first syllable:

- mi-gir-am "I'm taking"
- na-gereft-am "I did not take"
- be-gir-am "I should take"

In the vocative (xânom! "madam") and sometimes elsewhere, such as bale! "yes" or agar "if", the accent is also on the first syllable.

In compound verbs, the accent is on the first element:

- kâr kard-am "I worked"

However, in compound nouns, the accent is on the second element:

- ketâb-xâne "bookcase"

In the ezâfe construction, the first noun is optionally accented but generally loses its pitch:

- mardom-e Irân / mardom-e Irân "the people of Iran"

When a word is focussed, the pitch is raised, and the words that follow usually lose their accent:

- nâme-ye mâmân-am bud ru miz "it was my mom's letter that was on the table"

However, other researchers claim that the pitch of post-focus words is reduced but sometimes still audible.

=== Japanese ===
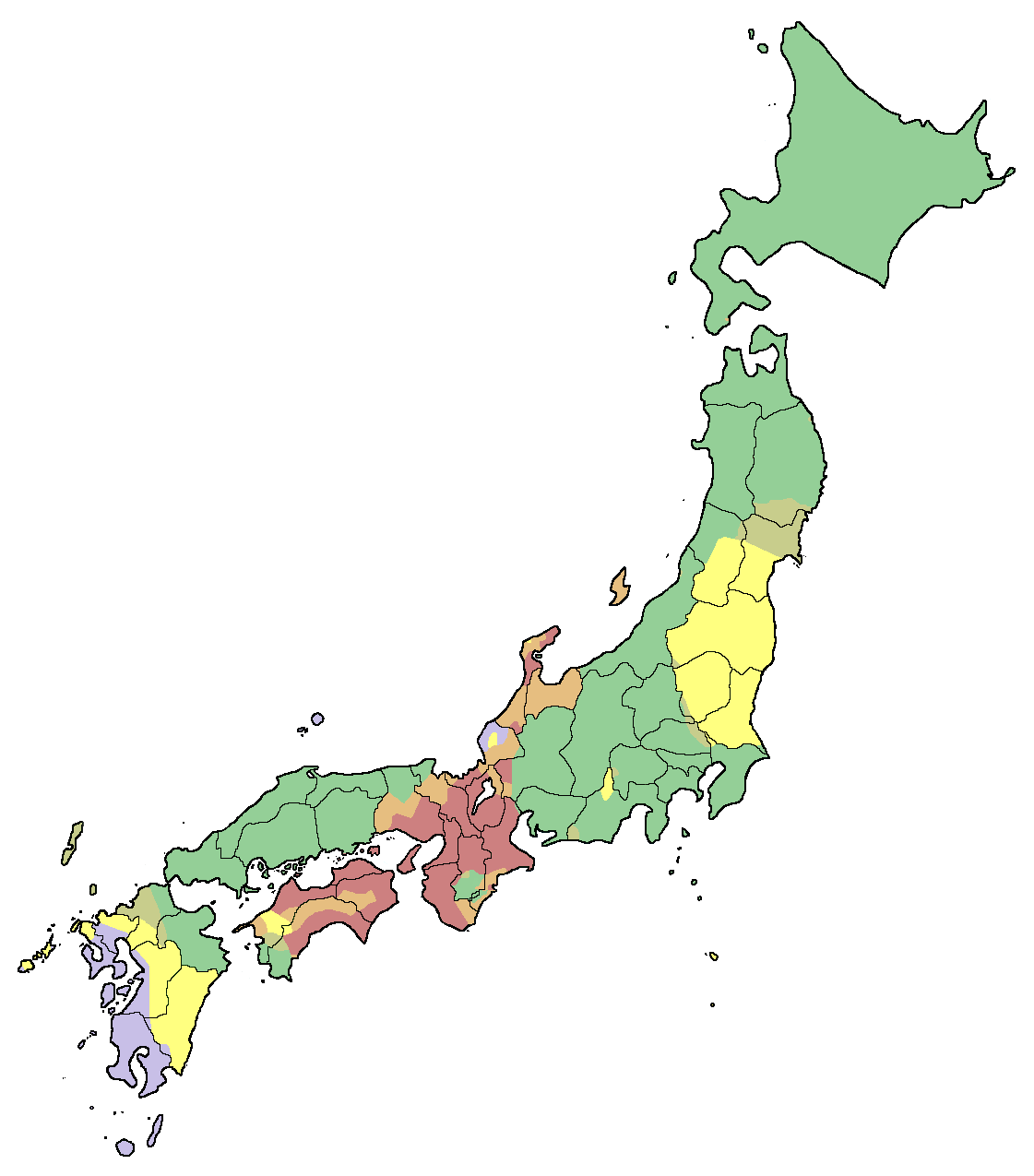
Map of Japanese pitch-accent types. Red: Tone plus variable downstep. Green: Variable downstep in accented words. Lavender: Fixed downstep in accented words. Yellow: Variable pitches but no distinction.

Standard Japanese and certain other varieties of Japanese are described as having a pitch accent, which differs significantly among dialects. In Standard Japanese, the "accent" may be characterized as a downstep rather than as pitch accent. The pitch of a word rises until it reaches a downstep and then drops abruptly. In a two-syllable word, a contrast thus occurs between high–low and low–high. Accentless words are also low–high, but the pitch of following enclitics differentiates them.

Accent on first mora			Accent on second mora			Accentless		
/kaꜜki o/	牡蠣を	oyster	/kakiꜜ o/	垣を	fence	/kaki o/	柿を	persimmon
high–low–low			low–high–low			low–high–high		

The Osaka accent (Kansai dialect) (marked red on the map to the right) differs from the Tokyo accent in that in some words, the first syllable of the word (always low in Tokyo Japanese unless accented) can be high. To give a full description of the accent of a word, therefore, it is necessary to specify not only the position of the accent (downstep) but also the height of the first syllable.

=== Korean ===
Standard (Seoul) Korean does not have pitch-accent. However, several other dialects retain a Middle Korean pitch-accent system.

In the dialect of North Gyeongsang, in southeastern South Korea, any syllable and the initial two syllables may have a pitch accent in the form of a high tone. For example, in trisyllabic words, there are four possible tone patterns:

Examples
Hangul	IPA	English
며느리	mjə́.nɯ.ɾi	daughter-in-law
어머니	ə.mə́.ni	mother
원어민	wə.nə.mín	native speaker
오라비	ó.ɾá.bi	elder brother

=== Shanghainese ===
The Shanghai dialect of Wu Chinese is marginally tonal, with characteristics of a pitch accent.

Not counting closed syllables (those with a final glottal stop), a monosyllabic Shanghainese may carry one of three tones: high, mid, low. The tones have a contour in isolation, but for the following purposes, it can be ignored. However, low tone always occurs after voiced consonants and only then. Thus, the only tonal distinction is after voiceless consonants and in vowel-initial syllables, and there is only a two-way distinction between high tone and mid tone.

In a polysyllabic word, the tone of the first syllable determines the tone of the entire word. If the first tone is high, the following syllables are mid. If it is either mid or low and not closed, the second syllable is high, and any following syllables are mid. If it is low and closed, the following syllables are mid. Thus, a mark for the high tone is all that is needed to note the tone in Shanghainese:

	Romanization	Hanzi	Pitch pattern	English
No voiced initial (mid tone)	au-da-li-ia	澳大利亚	mid–high–mid–mid	Australia
No voiced initial (high tone)	kón-kon-chi-tso	公共汽車	high–mid–mid–mid	bus
Voiced initial (not closed)	zaon-he-gnin	上海人	low–high–mid	Shanghainese person
Voiced initial (closed)	zeq-pen-gnin	日本人	low–mid–mid	Japanese person

=== Bantu languages ===
The Bantu languages are a large group of about 550 languages, spread over most of southern and central Africa. Proto-Bantu is believed to have had two tones: H and L. It does not appear to have had a pitch-accent system, as defined above, since words with such forms as HL, HH, LH, and LL were all found: *káda "charcoal", *cómbá "fish", *nyangá "horn" and *tope "mud". In other words, words like *cómbá could have two high tones, while others had one tone or none.

However, over time, processes such as Meeussen's rule, by which sequences such as HHH became HLL, LHL, or LLH, tended to eliminate all but one tone in a word in many Bantu languages, making them more accent-like. Thus in Chichewa, the word for "fish" (nsómba) now has HL tones, exactly like the word for "charcoal" (khála).

Another process that makes for culminativity in some Bantu languages is the interaction between stress and tone. The penultimate syllable of a word is stressed in many Bantu languages, and some of them tend to have high tones on the penultimate syllable. For example, in Chitumbuka, every phonological phrase is accented with a falling tone on the penultimate: ti-ku-phika sî:ma "we are cooking porridge". In other languages, such as Xhosa, the high tone is attracted to the antepenultimate although the penultimate being stressed.

Ciluba and Ruund, in the Democratic Republic of the Congo, are two Bantu languages that are interesting for their "tone reversal". Low tone is phonologically active in places that other languages of the same family have a high tone. Thus, in a word like *mukíla "tail", most other Bantu languages have a high tone on the second syllable, but Chiluba has mukìla and Ruund has mukìl, with a low-toned accent.

==== Luganda ====
Luganda, a language of Uganda, has some words with apparent tonal accents. They can be either high or falling (rising tones do not occur in Luganda). Falling tones are found on bimoraic syllables or word-finally:

- ensî "country"
- ekibúga "city"
- eddwâliro "hospital"

Some words, however, have two accents, which are joined in a plateau:

- Kámpálâ "Kampala"

Other words are accentless:

- ekitabo "book"

However, accentless words are not always without tones but usually receive a default tone on all syllables except the first one or the first mora:

- ekítábó "book"
- Bunyóró "Bunyoro" (name of region)

A double consonant at the beginning of a word counts as a mora. In such words, the first syllable also can have a default tone:

- Ttóró "Toro" (a region)

Default tones are also heard on the end of accented words if there is a gap of at least one mora after the accent (the default tones are lower in pitch than the preceding accent):

- amasérengétá "south"
- eddwâlíró "hospital"

The default tones are not always heard but disappear in certain contexts, such as if a noun is the subject of a sentence or used before a numeral:

- Mbarara kibúga "Mbarara is a city"
- ebitabo kkúmi "ten books"

In some contexts, such as affirmative verb + location, or phrases with "of"), the high tone of an accent (or of a default tone) can continue in a plateau until the next accented syllable:

- mu maséréngétá gá Úgáńda "in the south of Uganda"
- alí mú Búgáńda "he is in Buganda"

However, the situation with verbs is more complicated since some verbal roots have inherent word accent, and the prefixes added to the verb often have an accent. Also, some tenses (such as negative and relative clause tenses) add an accent to the final syllable.

When two or three accents appear in a row in a verb, H-H becomes H-L, and H-H-H becomes H-L-L. However, the default tones are not added on the syllables with deleted accents, which leads to forms like bálilabá (from *bá-lí-lába) "they will see". There, not one but two low-toned syllables follow the accent.

Another rule is that if two accents in the same verb are not next to each other, they form a plateau. Thus, the negative tense tágulâ "he does not buy" is pronounced tágúlâ, with a plateau.

==== Chichewa ====
Chichewa, a language widely spoken in Malawi, is tonal but has accentual properties. Most Chichewa simple nouns have only one high tone, usually on one of the last three syllables. (See Chichewa tones.)

- chímanga "maize"
- chikóndi "love"
- chinangwá "cassava" (usually pronounced chinăngwā, with rising tone on the penultimate)

However, many number of nouns have no high tone but are accentless. Unlike the accentless words in Luganda, however, they do not acquire any default tones but are pronounced with all the syllables low:

- chipatala "hospital"

A few nouns (often but not always compounds) have two high tones. If they are separated by only one syllable, they usually join in a plateau:

- chizólówezí "habit"
- bírímánkhwe "chameleon"

Most verbal roots in Chichewa are accentless. However, a few verbs also have lexical accents, but they are not inherited from Proto-Bantu. When there is an accent, it is always heard on the final -a of the verb:

- thokozá-ni "give thanks (pl.)"

Prefixes and suffixes add some accents. For example, the infinitive prefix ku- is postaccenting, adding a tone on the following syllable, while the suffix -nso "again/also" is preaccenting:

- fotokoza "explain" (toneless)
- kufótokoza "to explain"
- kufótokozánso "to explain again"

The verbal system is complicated because overlying the verb's tones and suffixes is a series of tonal patterns that changes by tense. There are at least eight patterns for affirmative tenses and other patterns for relative clauses and negative verbs.

For example, the present habitual tense has tones on the first and penultimate syllables, the recent past has a tone after the tense-marker -na-, the subjunctive has a tone on the final syllable and the potential is toneless. The tones apply, with minor variations, to all verbs, whether the stem is long or short:

- ndímafotokóza "I (usually) explain"
- ndinafótokoza "I explained (just now)"
- ndifotokozé "I should explain"
- ndingafotokoze "I could explain"

Most other tones tend to be suppressed when a verb has a penultimate accent. For example, in the negative future, both the tone of the future-tense marker, -dzá-, and the tone of the negative marker, sí- (both normally high), are neutralised:

- sindidzafotokóza "I will not explain"

Those and other processes cause most verb tenses to have only one or two high tones, which are at the beginning, the penultimate or the final of the verb stem or at a prefix or sometimes even both. That gives the impression that the tones in the resultant words are clearly accentuated.

=== English ===
Most dialects of English are classified as stress-accent languages. However, there are some dialects in which tone can play a part in the word accent.

==== Hong Kong English ====
Lexical words in Hong Kong English are assigned at least one H (high) tone. Disyllabic words may have the tone pattern H-o (clóckwise), H-H (sómetímes), o-H (creáte), where "o" stands for tonelessness. Trisyllabic words receive any one of seven possible tone assignments H-H-H (kángároo), H-H-o (hándwríting), H-o-H (róundabóut), H-o-o (thréátening), o-H-H (abóut-túrn), o-H-o (esséntial), o-o-H (recomménd). Toneless syllables receive other pitch assignments depending on their positions: word-initial toneless syllables are M(id)-toned, utterance-final toneless syllables are Low, and word-medial toneless syllables vary across two major sub-dialects in the community surfacing as either H or M. Because lexical stipulation of Hong Kong English tones are {H, o} privative, one is easily misled into thinking of Hong Kong English as a pitch-accented language. It is, however, probably more accurate to think of Hong Kong English as a language with lexical tones.

==== South African English ====
In Broad South African English, /h/ (phonetically [ɦ]) is often deleted, such as in word-initial stressed syllables (as in house), but at least as often, it is pronounced even if it seems to be deleted. The vowel that follows /h/ in the word-initial syllable often carries a low or low rising tone. In rapid speech, that can be the only trace of the deleted /h/. Potentially minimal tonal pairs are thus created, like oh (neutral [ʌʊ˧] or high falling [ʌʊ˦˥˩]) vs. hoe (low [ʌʊ˨] or low rising [ʌʊ˩˨]).

=== Welsh ===
In Welsh a stress accent usually comes on the penultimate syllable (with a few exceptions accented on the final, such as the word Cymraeg "Welsh"), and is usually on a low pitch followed by a rising pitch. "In Welsh, the stressed syllable is associated with lower pitch than less stressed or unstressed syllables ... However, the post-stress syllable in Welsh is typically produced on a higher pitch." It is believed that this came about because late Brythonic (the ancestor of Welsh) had a penultimate accent that was pronounced with a high pitch. When the final vowels of words were lost, the high pitch remained on what was now the final syllable, but the stress moved to the new penultimate. Thus LHL changed to LH, with the stress on the low syllable.

Although it is usually said that the high pitch is in the final syllable of the word, an acoustic study of Anglesey Welsh found that in that dialect at least the peak of the tone was actually in the penultimate syllable, thus the last two syllables were L+H* L.

=== Scottish Gaelic ===
Several northern dialects of Scottish Gaelic, such as those of Lewis, Wester Ross and Strathnaver, feature pitch accents which derive from vowel hiatus. For instance, the words bò "cow" and bodha "reef" are a minimal pair, but the former is pronounced with a level or rising tone, as [b̥oː˧, b̥oː˧˥], and the latter with a falling tone beginning rising or high, as [b̥oː˦˥˨, b̥oː˥˧]. A similar tonal contrast is found in ostensibly disyllabic words. Scottish Gaelic has a phenomenon of epenthesis whereby certain consonant clusters (see here for a full list) feature a repeating, equally stressed vowel, creating a second syllable whose vowel is considered a unit with, or echo of, the first. This can be seen in the minimal pair falbh "to leave", pronounced [fal̪ˠa˦˥] with a rising tone across the word and both syllables equally stressed, and falamh "empty", pronounced [ˈfa˧˥.l̪ˠu˥˩] with a rising tone followed by a falling one.

Ternes claimed that Scottish Gaelic is inherently a pitch-accent language, which manifests in the dialects of Argyll as glottalisation akin to stød.

=== Yaqui ===
The Yaqui are a native American people living mostly in Mexico but also in Arizona. About 17,000 people are said to speak Yaqui, which is a Uto-Aztecan language.

Yaqui has a tonal accent in which the accent is on the first or the second mora of the word. A long vowel has two moras in Yaqui, and a short vowel or diphthong has one mora. After the accent, the high tone continues with a very slight decline until the end of the word.

About two thirds of words have an accent on the first mora, and all tones of the word are then high:

- kárí "house"
- hamút "woman"
- tééká "sky" (where ee represents a long vowel)
- teéká "lay down"

In some words with a long first vowel, the accent moves to the second syllable, and the vowel of the first syllable then becomes short:

- bákót "snake"
- bakóttá "snake (object of verb)"

In a certain kind of reduplication, the accent moves to the first mora, and the next consonant is then usually doubled. At the same time, since a long vowel cannot follow the accent, the vowel after the accent is also shortened:

- teéká "lay down"
- téttéká "in the process of laying something down"

At the end of a phrase, the pitch drops, with a low boundary tone.

To an English-speaker, the first high tone in Yaqui "sounds very much like a stress". However, acoustic studies show that the amplitude of the accented syllable is not really greater than the other syllables in the word are.

== See also ==
- Stress (linguistics)
- Tone (linguistics)

== Bibliography ==
- Allen, W. Sidney (1987) [1968]. Vox Graeca (3rd ed.). Cambridge University Press. ISBN 978-0-521-33555-3.
- Beckman, Mary (1986). Stress and Non-stress Accent. Netherlands Phonetics Archives. Vol. VII. Dordrecht: Foris. doi:10.1515/9783110874020. ISBN 90-6765-243-1.
- Chen, Matthew Y. (2000). Tone Sandhi: Patterns across Chinese Dialects. Cambridge University Press. ISBN 0-521-652723.
- Cooper, Sarah E. (2015). Intonation in Anglesey Welsh (PDF) (Ph.D.). Bangor University. Archived from the original (PDF) on 13 April 2018.
- Dahl, Östen; Koptjevskaja-Tamm, Maria, eds. (2001). The Circum-Baltic Languages: Grammar and typology. Studies in Language Companion Series. Vol. 55 (2). John Benjamins Publishing. ISBN 978-1-58811-042-8.
- Downing, Laura J. (2012). "On the (Non-)congruence of Focus and Prominence in Tumbuka" (PDF). In Marlo, Michael R.; Adams, Nikki B.; et al. (eds.). Selected Proceedings of the 42nd Annual Conference on African Linguistics. Somerville, MA: Cascadilla Proceedings Project. pp. 122–133. ISBN 978-1-57473-453-9.
- Downing, Laura; Mtenje, Al (2017). The Phonology of Chichewa. The Phonology of the World's Languages. Oxford University Press. doi:10.1093/oso/9780198724742.001.0001. ISBN 978-0-19-872474-2.
- Dutcher, Katharine; Paster, Mary (2008). "Contour Tone Distribution in Luganda" (PDF). In Abner, Natasha; Bishop, Jason (eds.). Proceedings of the 27th West Coast Conference on Formal Linguistics. Somerville, MA: Cascadilla Proceedings Project. pp. 123–131. ISBN 978-1-57473-428-7.
- Fortson, Benjamin W. (IV) (2004). Indo European Language And Culture: An Introduction. Blackwell Textbooks In Linguistics. Vol. 19 (1st ed.). ISBN 978-1-4051-0316-9.
- Gordon, Matthew (2014). "Disentangling stress and pitch accent: A typology of prominence at different prosodic levels" ( (PDF)). In Hulst, Harry van der (ed.). Word Stress: Theoretical and Typological Issues. Oxford University Press. pp. 83–118. Archived from the original on 4 May 2018.
- Hannahs, S.J. (2013). The Phonology of Welsh. The Phonology of the World's Languages. OUP. doi:10.1093/acprof:oso/9780199601233.001.0001. ISBN 978-0-19-960123-3.
- Hayes, Bruce (1995). Metrical stress theory: Principles and case studies (2nd ed.). University of Chicago Press. ISBN 978-0-226-32104-2.
- Herrwegen, Alice (2002). De kölsche Sproch: Kurzgrammatik Kölsch (in German and Kölsch) (1st ed.). J.P. Bachem. ISBN 978-3-7616-1604-8.
- Hosseini, Seyed Ayat (2014). The Phonology and Phonetics of Prosodic Prominence in Persian (PDF) (Ph.D.). University of Tokyo.
- Hualde, J. I. (2007). "Historical Convergence and Divergence in Basque Accentuation". In Riad, Tomas; Gussenhoven, Carlos (eds.). Typological Studies in Word and Sentence Prosody. Phonology and Phonetics: Tones and Tunes. Vol. 12-1. De Gruyter Mouton. pp. 291–322. doi:10.1515/9783110207569.291. ISBN 978-3-11-019057-1.
- Hulst, Harry van der; Goedemans, Rob; Zanten, Ellen van, eds. (2011). A survey of word accentual patterns in the languages of the world. Berlin: De Gruyter Mouton. ISBN 978-3-11-019631-3.
  - Zanten, Ellen van; Dol, Philomena (2010). "4. Word stress and pitch accent in Papuan languages". Word stress and pitch accent in Papuan languages. pp. 113–155. doi:10.1515/9783110198966.1.113. ISBN 978-3-11-019631-3.
  - Downing, Laura (2010). "8. Accent in African languages". Accent in African languages. pp. 381–428. doi:10.1515/9783110198966.1.381. ISBN 978-3-11-019631-3.
- Kamoga, F. K.; Stevick, Earl (1968). Luganda Basic Course (PDF). FSI Basic Course. Washington: Foreign Service Institute.
- Kiparsky, Paul (2017) [1995]. "Livonian stød" (PDF). In Kehrein, W.; Köhnlein, Bj.; Boersma, P.; van Oostendorp, M. (eds.). Segmental Structure and Tone. De Gruyter. pp. 195–210. doi:10.1515/9783110341263-007. ISBN 978-3-11-034126-3.
- Kortmann, Bernd; Auwera, Johan van der, eds. (2011). The Languages and Linguistics of Europe: A comprehensive guide. De Gruyter Mouton. doi:10.1515/9783110220261. ISBN 978-3-11-022025-4.
- Lass, Roger (2002). "South African English". In Mesthrie, Rajend (ed.). Language in South Africa. Cambridge University Press. pp. 104–126. doi:10.1017/CBO9780511486692. ISBN 978-0-521-79105-2.
- Lee, Chungmin; Gordon, Matthew; Büring, Daniel (2007). Topic and Focus: Cross-Linguistic Perspectives on Meaning and Intonation. Studies in Linguistics and Philosophy. doi:10.1007/978-1-4020-4796-1. ISBN 978-1-4020-4795-4.
- Louw, Johan K. (1987). "Word lists". Pang'onopang'ono ndi Mtolo: Chichewa: A Practical Course [Little by little you make a bundle] (in Nyanja and English). Vol. 3. UNISA Press.
- Lundquist, Jesse; Yates, Anthony (2017). "The Morphology of Proto-Indo-European" ( (PDF)). In Klein, Jared; Joseph, Brian; Matthias, Fritz (eds.). Handbook of Comparative and Historical Indo-European Linguistics. HSK. Vol. 43-3. De Gruyter. pp. 2079–2195. doi:10.1515/9783110542431-043. ISBN 978-3-11-054036-9. Archived from the original on 11 November 2020.
- Oftedal, Magne (1956). A linguistic survey of the Gaelic dialects of Scotland, Vol. III: The Gaelic of Leurbost, Isle of Lewis. Oslo: Norsk Tidsskrift for Sprogvidenskap.
- Masļanska, Olga; Rubīna, Aina (1992). Valsts valoda - Курс лекций латышского языка [Official language - Latvian language lecture course] (in Russian). Riga: LU.
- Probert, Philomen (2003). A New Short Guide the Accentuation of Ancient Greek. Bristol Classical Press. ISBN 978-1-85399-599-6.
- Pierrehumbert, Janet B.; Beckman, Mary E. (1988), Japanese Tone Structure, MIT Press: Cambridge, MA, ISBN 0-262-16109-5
- Ruppell, A.M. (2017). The Cambridge Introduction to Sanskrit. doi:10.1017/9781107088283. ISBN 978-1-107-08828-3.
- Sadat-Tehrani, Nima (2007). The intonational grammar of Persian (Ph.D.). University of Manitoba. hdl:1993/2839.
- Smiljanic, Rajka (2004). Lexical, Pragmatic, and Positional Effects on Prosody in Two Dialects of Croatian and Serbian. New York: Routledge. doi:10.4324/9780203958193. ISBN 0-415-97117-9.
- Smiljanic, Rajka (2013). Lexical, Pragmatic, and Positional Effects on Prosody in Two Dialects of Croatian and Serbian: An Acoustic Study. Routledge. doi:10.4324/9780203958193. ISBN 978-1-135-46464-6.
- Smyth, H.W. (1984) [1920]. Messing, Gordon M. (ed.). Greek Grammar. Harvard University Press. ISBN 978-0-674-36250-5.
- Vaan, Michiel de, ed. (13–14 June 2003). Germanic tone accents: proceedings of the First International Workshop on Franconian Tone Accents (in German and English). Leiden: Franz Steiner. ISBN 978-3-515-08877-0.
  - Goosens, Jan (2003). Historische und geographische Randbedingungen des genker Tonakzentsystems (in German). pp. 35–50.
- Whitney, William Dw. (1889) [1879]. Sanskrit Grammar (2nd ed.). Geoffrey Cumberlege.
- Willis, David (2010) [1993]. "Old and Middle Welsh". In Ball, Martin J.; Müller, Nicole (eds.). The Celtic languages (PDF). Routledge Language Family Descriptions (2nd ed.). pp. 117–160. ISBN 978-0-415-42279-6.
- Wrede, Adam (1958). Neuer kölnischer Sprachschatz (in German). Vol. 1–3. Köln: Greven.
- Yip, Moira (2002). Tone. Cambridge Textbooks In Linguistics. doi:10.1017/CBO9781139164559. ISBN 978-0-521-77314-0.
