= Lunda (Asia Minor) =

Ancient city in Phrygia, Asia Minor

Coordinates: 38°01′47″N 29°27′18″E

Lunda or Lounda is an ancient city in Phrygia, Asia Minor (modern Turkey). Under the Roman Empire, it was in the province of Phrygia Prima (Pacatiana), in the civil Diocese of Pontus. The Anatolian site is now known as Isabey.

== Ecclesiastical history ==
Lunda was a suffragan bishopric of the Metropolitan Archbishopric of Laodicea (on the Lycus), under the Patriarchate of Constantinople.

Two incumbents are known:

- Niceforus attended the Second Council of Nicaea in 787
- Eustachius participated in the Council of Constantinople in 879-880.

The diocese was nominally restored in 1926 as the Roman Catholic titular bishopric of Lunda.

== See also ==
- Lunda (disambiguation)
- Mission sui iuris of Lunda (Mlundi) in Angola

== Sources and external links ==
- GCatholic - data for all sections
