= Turanic languages =

Turanic languages may refer to:

- Ural-Altaic languages, a proposed language family consisting of the Uralic, Yukaghir, Altaic languages
- Turanian languages, a proposed language family consisting of the Ural-Altaic, Tai, Malayo-Polynesian, Tibeto-Burman, Munda, and Dravidian, with Japonic, Koreanic, Koryak, Itelmen, and the Caucasian languages sometimes being included

== See also ==
- Turanism
- Nostratic languages
- Altaic languages
