= Vladislav Illich-Svitych =

Soviet linguist (1934–1966)

- Владислав Иллич-Свитыч
- Born: Vladislav Markovich Illich-Svitych; 12 September 1934; Kyiv, Soviet Union (now Ukraine)
- Died: 22 August 1966 (aged 31); Shchyolkovo, Soviet Union
- Education: Moscow State University
- Occupation: Linguist
- Scientific career
- Institutions: RAN Institute for Slavic Studies
- Academic advisors: Samuil Bernstein
- Notable students: Vitaly Shevoroshkin

Vladislav Markovich Illich-Svitych (Russian: Владисла́в Ма́ркович И́ллич-Сви́тыч, also transliterated as Illič-Svityč; 12 September 1934 – 22 August 1966) was a Soviet linguist and accentologist. He was a founding father of comparative Nostratic linguistics and the Moscow School of Comparative Linguistics.

== Biography ==
Of Polish Jewish descent, Illich-Svitych was born in Kyiv. In 1941, he and his parents moved to Chkalov and later to Moscow. His father, Mark Vladislavovich Illich-Svitych (1886–1963), worked as a bookkeeper. His mother, Klara Moiseevna Desner (1901–1955), was chief director of puppet theater in Orenburg.

He resuscitated the long-forgotten Nostratic hypothesis, originally proposed by Holger Pedersen in 1903.

== Death ==
Vladislav Illich-Svitych died in an automobile accident on 22 August 1966, in the Shchyolkovsky District to the north-east of Moscow. According to the official version, he was embarking on a field trip to collect data on the Hungarian dialects of the Carpathians (which would be south-west of Moscow).

This version was disputed by Aharon Dolgopolsky, who blamed Soviet bureaucracy for the early death of his young colleague. According to him, as Illich-Svitych was not a Moscow native, he required a special residence permit allowing him to reside in the capital, which, like many Soviet citizens in the 1960s, he was not able to secure. As a result, he had to live in a tiny room in a small village close to the city limits, and commuted to the institute daily by car. According to Dolgopolsky, it was actually on a return trip from the institute that Illich-Svitych had his fatal accident, he presumed from being lost in thought behind the wheel.

His death prevented him from completing the Comparative Dictionary of Nostratic Languages, but the ambitious work was continued by his colleagues, including Sergei Starostin and Vladimir Dybo.

Illich-Svitych was buried at the Obraztsovskoye Cemetery in the Shchyolkovsky District of the Moscow Region. A phrase in the Nostratic language is engraved on his tombstone.

== Selected publications ==
- Nominal Accentuation in Baltic and Slavic, translated by R. L. Leed and R. F. Feldstein, Cambridge, London 1979: the MIT Press. (originally edited in Russian in 1963)

== See also ==
- Illich-Svitych's law
