= Nostratic languages =

Proposed superfamily of Eurasian and African languages

Nostratic
- (widely rejected)
- Geographic distribution: Europe, Asia except for the southeast, North and Northeast Africa, the Arctic
- Linguistic classification: Hypothetical macrofamily
- Subdivisions: Indo-European (including Burushaski); Uralic; Altaic (Turkic, Mongolic and Tungusic); Kartvelian; Afroasiatic (not always considered); Koreanic; Japonic; Ainu; Dravidian; Tyrsenian †; Elamite (sometimes included) †; Sumerian (sometimes included) †; Nivkh (sometimes included); Yukaghir (not always considered); Chukotko-Kamchatkan (not always considered); Eskaleut (not always considered); North Caucasian (including Hattic † and Hurro-Urartian †) (not always considered); Vasconic (not always considered); Sino-Tibetan (including Kusunda) (not always considered); Yeniseian (not always considered)

Language codes
- Glottolog: None
- Notes: † indicates a dead language

A phylogenetic representation of Nostratic proposed by Allan Bomhard in 2008

Nostratic is a hypothetical language macrofamily including many of the language families of northern Eurasia, first proposed in 1903. Though the Nostratic hypothesis once had a measure of support among mainstream linguists, it is now generally considered a fringe theory with very low support. The exact composition of languages families included in Nostrastic varies based on proponent; it typically includes the Kartvelian, Indo-European, and the controversial Ural-Altaic family, as well as the Afroasiatic languages and the hypothetical Elamo-Dravidian languages.

The Nostratic hypothesis originated with Holger Pedersen in the early 20th century. The name "Nostratic" was put forth by Pedersen (1903) and is derived from the Latin nostrates "fellow countrymen." The hypothesis was significantly expanded in the 1960s by Soviet linguists, notably Vladislav Illich-Svitych and Aharon Dolgopolsky.

The hypothesis has fallen out of favour since the latter half of the 20th century and has limited degrees of acceptance, predominantly among a minority of Russian linguists. Linguists worldwide mostly reject many macrofamily hypotheses, including the Nostratic, with the exception of Dené–Yeniseian languages, which has been met with some degree of acceptance. In Russia, the Nostratic hypothesis is endorsed by a minority of linguists, such as Vladimir Dybo, but is not a generally accepted hypothesis. Some linguists take an agnostic view. Eurasiatic, a similar grouping, was proposed by Joseph Greenberg (2000) and endorsed by Merritt Ruhlen.

== History of research ==
=== Origin of the Nostratic hypothesis ===
The last quarter of the 19th century saw various linguists putting forward proposals linking the Indo-European languages to other language families, such as Finno-Ugric and Altaic.

These proposals were taken much further in 1903 when Holger Pedersen proposed "Nostratic" as a common ancestor for the Indo-European, Finno-Ugric, Samoyed, Turkish, Mongolian, Manchu, Yukaghir, Eskimo, Semitic, and Hamitic languages, with the door left open to the eventual inclusion of others.

The name Nostratic derives from the Latin word nostrās, with plural nostrātēs, meaning "our fellow-countryman," and has been defined, since Pedersen, as consisting of those language families that are related to Indo-European. Merritt Ruhlen notes that this definition is not properly taxonomic but amorphous, since there are broader and narrower degrees of relatedness, and moreover, some linguists who broadly accept the concept (such as Greenberg and Ruhlen himself) have criticised the name as reflecting the ethnocentrism frequent among Europeans at the time. Martin Bernal has described the term as distasteful because it implies that speakers of other language families are excluded from academic discussion. However, some people like Pedersen's older contemporary Henry Sweet attributed some of the resistance by Indo-European specialists to hypotheses of wider genetic relationships as "prejudice against dethroning [Indo-European] from its proud isolation and affiliating it to the languages of yellow races." Proposed alternative names such as Mitian, formed from the characteristic Nostratic first- and second-person pronouns mi "I" and ti "you" (more accurately "thee"'), have not attained the same currency.

An early supporter was the French linguist Albert Cuny—better known for his role in the development of the laryngeal theory—who published his Recherches sur le vocalisme, le consonantisme et la formation des racines en « nostratique », ancêtre de l'indo-européen et du chamito-sémitique (Researches on the Vocalism, Consonantism, and Formation of Roots in "Nostratic," Ancestor of Indo-European and Hamito-Semitic) in 1943. Although Cuny enjoyed a high reputation as a linguist, the work was coldly received.

=== Moscow School of Comparative Linguistics ===
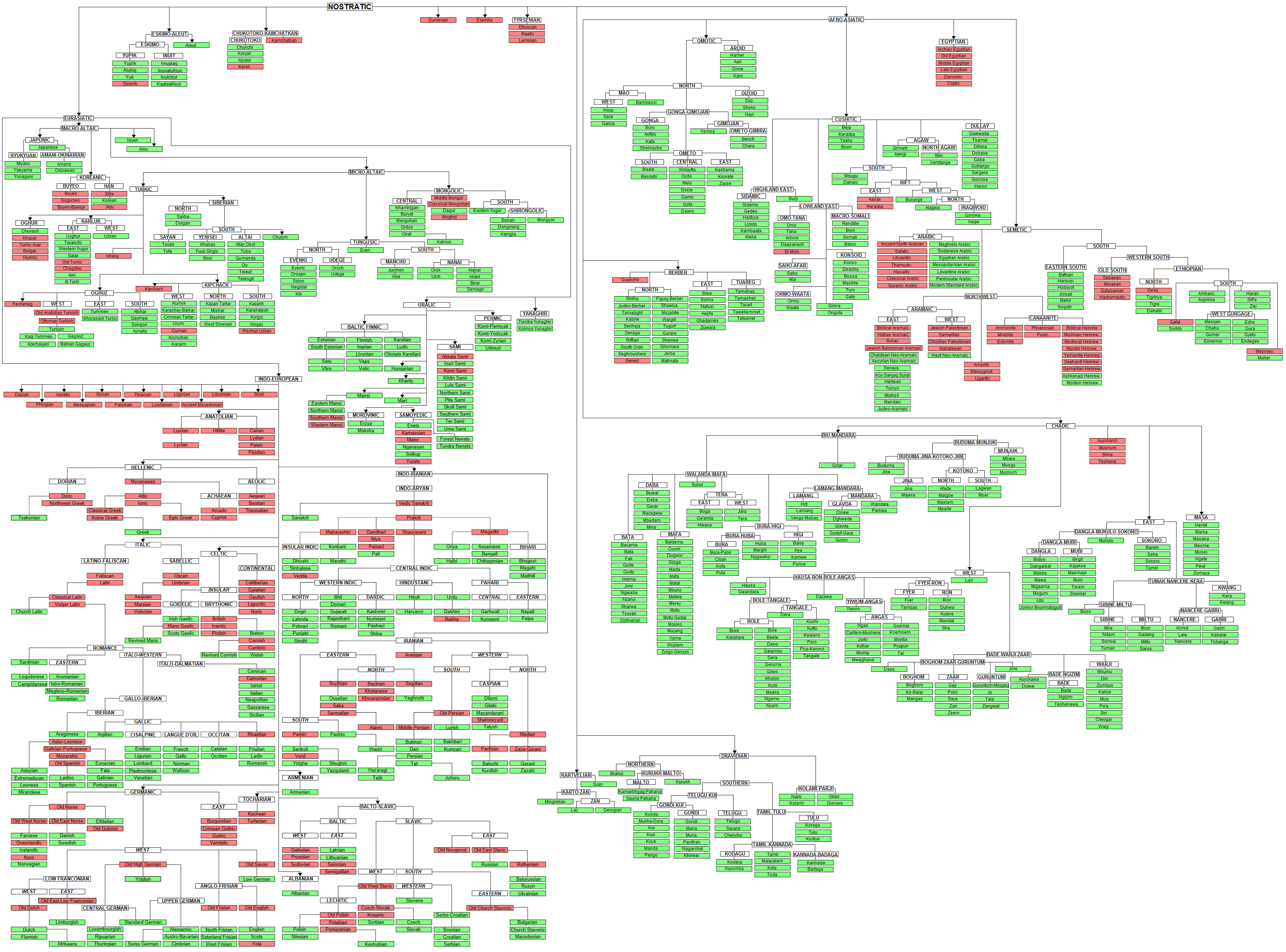
More detailed tree of the Nostratic languages

While Pedersen's Nostratic hypothesis did not make much headway in the West, it became quite popular in the Soviet Union. Working independently at first, Vladislav Illich-Svitych and Aharon Dolgopolsky elaborated the first version of the contemporary form of the hypothesis during the 1960s. They expanded it to include additional language families. Illich-Svitych also prepared the first dictionary of the hypothetical language. Dolgopolsky's most recent Nostratic Dictionary, published in 2008, is considered the most up-to-date attempt at a Nostratic lexicon.

A principal source for the items in Illich-Svitych's dictionary was the earlier work of Alfredo Trombetti (1866–1929), an Italian linguist who had developed a classification scheme for all the world's languages, widely reviled at the time and subsequently ignored by almost all linguists. In Trombetti's time, a widely held view on classifying languages was that similarity in inflections is the surest proof of genetic relationship. In the interim, the view had taken hold that the comparative method—previously used as a means of studying languages already known to be related and without any thought of classification—is the most effective means to establish genetic relationship, eventually hardening into the conviction that it is the only legitimate means to do so. This view was basic to the outlook of the new Nostraticists. Although Illich-Svitych adopted many of Trombetti's etymologies, he sought to validate them by a systematic comparison of the sound systems of the languages concerned.

== Constituent language families ==
The language families proposed for inclusion in Nostratic vary, but all Nostraticists agree on a common core of language families, with differences of opinion over the inclusion of additional families.

The three groups universally accepted among Nostraticists are Indo-European, Uralic, and Altaic. While the validity of Altaic itself is generally rejected by linguists, it is taken for granted by Nostraticists. Nearly all proponents also include the Kartvelian and Dravidian language families.

Following Pedersen, Illich-Svitych, and Dolgopolsky, most advocates of the theory have included Afroasiatic, though criticisms by Joseph Greenberg and others from the late 1980s onward suggested a reassessment of this position.

The Sumerian and Etruscan languages, regarded as language isolates by mainstream linguists, are thought by some Nostraticists to be Nostratic languages as well. Others, however, consider one or both to be members of another macrofamily called Dené–Caucasian. Another notional isolate, the Elamite language, also figures in a number of Nostratic classifications.

In 1987 Joseph Greenberg proposed a similar macrofamily which he called Eurasiatic. It included the same "Euraltaic" core (Indo-European, Uralic, and Altaic), but excluded some of the above-listed families, most notably Afroasiatic. At about this time Russian Nostraticists, notably Sergei Starostin, constructed a revised version of Nostratic which was slightly broader than Greenberg's grouping but which similarly omitted Afroasiatic.

Beginning in the early 2000s, a consensus emerged among proponents of the Nostratic hypothesis. Greenberg basically agreed with the Nostratic concept, though he stressed a deep internal division between its northern "tier" (his Eurasiatic) and a southern "tier'"(principally Afroasiatic and Dravidian). Georgiy Starostin (2002) arrives at a tripartite overall grouping: he considers Afroasiatic, Nostratic, and Elamite to be roughly equidistant and more closely related to each other than to anything else. Sergei Starostin's school has now re-included Afroasiatic in a broadly defined Nostratic, while reserving the term Eurasiatic to designate the narrower subgrouping which comprises the rest of the macrofamily. Recent proposals thus differ mainly on the precise placement of Kartvelian and Dravidian.

According to Greenberg, Eurasiatic and Amerind form a genetic node, being more closely related to each other than either is to "the other families of the Old World." There are a number of hypotheses incorporating Nostratic into an even broader linguistic "mega-phylum," sometimes called Borean, which would also include at least the Dené–Caucasian and perhaps also the Amerind and Austric superfamilies. The term SCAN has been used for a group that would include Sino-Caucasian, Amerind, and Nostratic. None of these proposed links have found wider acceptance outside of Nostraticists.

The following table summarizes the constituent language families of Nostratic, as described by Holger Pedersen, Vladislav Illich-Svitych, Sergei Starostin, and Aharon Dolgopolsky.

Linguist	Indo-European	Afroasiatic	Uralic	Altaic	Dravidian	Kartvelian	Eskaleut	Yukaghir	Sumerian	Chukchi-Kamchatkan	Gilyak	Etruscan
Pedersen	Yes	Yes (Note: Represented by "Semitic")	Yes (Note: Pedersen did not group Finno-Ugric and Samoyedic into a single Uralic language family)	Yes	No	No	Yes	Yes	No	No	No	No
Illich-Svitych	Yes	Yes	Yes	Yes	Yes	Yes	No	No	No	No	No	No
Starostin	Yes	No	Yes	Yes	Yes	Yes	Yes	No	No	No	No	No
Dolgopolsky	Yes	Yes	Yes	Yes	Yes	Yes	Yes	Yes	No	Yes	Yes	Yes

== Proposed features of Proto-Nostratic ==
According to Dolgopolsky, the Proto-Nostratic language had analytic structure, which he argues by diverging of post- and prepositions of auxiliary words in descendant languages. Dolgopolsky posits three lexical categories in the Proto-Nostratic language:

- Lexical words
- Pronouns
- Auxiliary words

Word order was subject–object–verb when the subject was a noun, and object–verb–subject when it was a pronoun. An attributive lexical word preceded its head; a pronominal attributive ("my," "this") might follow the noun. Auxiliary words are considered to be postpositions.

== Status within comparative linguistics ==
The Nostratic hypothesis is not endorsed by the mainstream of comparative linguistics.

Nostraticists tend to refuse to include in their schema language families for which no proto-language has yet been reconstructed. This approach was criticized by Joseph Greenberg on the ground that genetic classification is necessarily prior to linguistic reconstruction, but this criticism has so far had no effect on Nostraticist theory and practice.

Certain critiques have pointed out that the data from individual established language families that is cited in Nostratic comparisons often involves a high degree of errors; Campbell (1998), for example, demonstrates this for Uralic data. Defenders of the Nostratic theory argue that were this to be true, it would remain that in classifying languages genetically, positives count for vastly more than negatives (Ruhlen 1994). The reason for this is that, above a certain threshold, resemblances in sound/meaning correspondences are highly improbable mathematically.

Pedersen's original Nostratic proposal synthesized earlier macrofamilies, some of which, including Indo-Uralic, involved extensive comparison of inflections. It is true that the Russian Nostraticists initially emphasized lexical comparisons. Critics argue that were one to collect all the words from the various known Indo-European languages and dialects which have at least one of any four meanings, one could easily form a list that would cover any conceivable combination of two consonants and a vowel (of which there are only about 20×20×5 = 2000). Nostraticists respond that they do not compare isolated lexical items but reconstructed proto-languages. To include a word for a proto-language it must be found in a number of languages and the forms must be relatable by regular sound changes. In addition, many languages have restrictions on root structure, reducing the number of possible root-forms far below its mathematical maximum. These languages include, among others, Indo-European, Uralic, and Altaic—all the core languages of the Nostratic hypothesis. For a highly critical assessment of the work of the Moscow School, especially the work of Illich-Svitych, see Campbell and Poser 2008:243-264. Campbell and Poser argue that Nostratic, as reconstructed by Illich-Svitych and others, is "typologically flawed." For instance, they point out that, surprisingly, very few Nostratic roots contain two voiceless stops, which are less marked and should therefore occur more frequently, and where such roots do occur, in almost all cases the second stop occurs after a sonorant. In summary, Campbell and Poser reject the Nostratic hypothesis and, as a parting shot, state that they "seriously doubt that further research will result in any significant support for this hypothesized macro-family."

Proto-Indo-European *b[h]ars- seems to be a cultural loanword from Semitic (though several reputable Indo-Europeanists dispute this and consider it to be a native IE word). Much of the IE agricultural lexicon is not shared among all branches and seems to have been borrowed, thus supporting the view that the expansion of IE languages was post-Neolithic rather than Neolithic as postulated by Renfrew's theory.

== See also ==
- Borean languages
- Classification of Japanese
- Indo-Semitic languages
- Indo-Uralic languages
- Proto-Human language
- Proto-Uralic language
- Ural-Altaic languages
- Uralic-Yukaghir languages
- Uralo-Siberian languages

== Bibliography ==
- Baldi, Philip (2002). The Foundations of Latin. Berlin: Mouton de Gruyter.
- Bengtson, John D. (1998). "The 'Far East' of Nostratic". Mother Tongue Newsletter 31:35–38 (image files)
- Campbell, Lyle (1998). "Nostratic: a personal assessment". In Joseph C. Salmons and Brian D. Joseph (eds.), Nostratic: Sifting the Evidence. Current Issues in Linguistic Theory 142. John Benjamins.
- Campbell, Lyle, and William J. Poser (2008). Language Classification: History and Method. Cambridge: Cambridge University Press.
- Campbell, Lyle (2004). Historical Linguistics: An Introduction (2nd ed.). Cambridge: The MIT Press.
- Cuny, Albert (1924). Etudes prégrammaticales sur le domaine des langues indo-européennes et chamito-sémitiques. Paris: Champion.
- Cuny, Albert (1943). Recherches sur le vocalisme, le consonantisme et la formation des racines en « nostratique », ancêtre de l'indo-européen et du chamito-sémitique. Paris: Adrien Maisonneuve.
- Cuny, Albert (1946). Invitation à l'étude comparative des langues indo-européennes et des langues chamito-sémitiques. Bordeaux: Brière.
- Dolgopolsky, Aharon (1998). The Nostratic Macrofamily and Linguistic Paleontology. McDonald Institute for Archaeological Research. ISBN 978-0-9519420-7-9
- Dolgopolsky, Aharon (2008). Nostratic Dictionary. McDonald Institute for Archaeological Research.
- Dybo, Vladimir (2004). "On Illič-Svityč's study ‘Basic Features of the Proto-Language of the Nostratic Language Family'." In Nostratic Centennial Conference: The Pécs Papers, edited by Irén Hegedűs and Paul Sidwell, 115-119. Pécs: Lingua Franca Group.
- Flannery, Kent V. (1969). In: P. J. Ucko and G. W. Dimbleby (eds.), The Domestication and Exploitation of Plants and Animals 73-100. Aldine, Chicago, IL.
- Gamkrelidze, Thomas V., and Vjačeslav V. Ivanov (1995). Indo-European and the Indo-Europeans, translated by Johanna Nichols, 2 volumes. Berlin and New York: Mouton de Gruyter. ISBN 3-11-014728-9
- Greenberg, Joseph (2000, 2002). Indo-European and its Closest Relatives. The Eurasiatic Language Family. (Stanford University), v.1 Grammar, v.2 Lexicon.
- Greenberg, Joseph (2005). Genetic Linguistics: Essays on Theory and Method, edited by William Croft. Oxford: Oxford University Press.
- Illich-Svitych, V. M. В. М. Иллич-Свитыч (1971-1984). Опыт сравнения ностратических языков (семитохамитский, картвельский, индоевропейский, уральский, дравидийский, алтайский). Введение. Сравнительный словарь. 3 vols. Moscow: Наука.
- Kaiser, M.; Shevoroshkin, V. (1988). "Nostratic". Annu. Rev. Anthropol. 17: 309–329. doi:10.1146/annurev.an.17.100188.001521.
- Kaiser, M. (1989). "Remarks on Historical Phonology: From Nostratic to Indo-European". Reconstructing Languages and Cultures BPX 20:51-56.
- Manaster Ramer, Alexis (?). A "Glottalic" Theory of Nostratic.
- Norquest, Peter (1998). "Greenberg's Visit to Arizona". Mother Tongue Newsletter 31:25f. (image files)
- Renfrew, Colin (1991). "Before Babel: Speculations on the Origins of Linguistic Diversity". Cambridge Archaeological Journal. 1 (1): 3–23. doi:10.1017/S0959774300000238. S2CID 161811559.
- Renfrew, Colin, and Daniel Nettle, editors (1999). Nostratic: Examining a Linguistic Macrofamily. McDonald Institute for Archaeological Research. ISBN 978-1-902937-00-7
- Ruhlen, Merritt (1991). A Guide to the World's Languages, Volume 1: Classification. Edward Arnold. ISBN 0-340-56186-6
- Ruhlen, Merritt (1994). On the Origin of Languages: Studies in Linguistic Taxonomy. Stanford, California: Stanford University Press.
- Ruhlen, Merritt (1998). "Toutes parentes, toutes différentes". La Recherche 306:69–75. (French translation of a Scientific American article.)
- Ruhlen, Merritt (2001). "Taxonomic Controversies in the Twentieth Century". In: Jürgen Trabant and Sean Ward (eds.), New Essays on the Origin of Language 197–214. Berlin: Mouton de Gruyter.
- Salmons, Joseph C., and Brian D. Joseph, editors (1998). Nostratic: Sifting the Evidence. John Benjamins. ISBN 1-55619-597-4
- Stachowski, Marek, "Teoria nostratyczna i szkoła moskiewska".(pdf) – LingVaria 6/1 (2011): 241-274
- Starostin, Georgiy S. (1998). "Alveolar Consonants in Proto-Dravidian: One or More?". (pdf) Pages 1–14 (?) in Proceedings on South Asian languages
- Starostin, Georgiy S. (2002). "On the Genetic Affiliation of the Elamite Language". (pdf) Mother Tongue 7.
- Starostin, George; Kassian, Alexei; Trofimov, Artem; Zhivlov, Mikhail. 2017. 400-item basic wordlist for potentially "Nostratic" languages. Moscow: Laboratory for Oriental and Comparative Studies of the School of Advanced Studies in the Humanities, Russian Presidential Academy.
- Sweet, Henry (1900, 1995, 2007). The History of Language. ISBN 81-85231-04-4 (1995); ISBN 1-4326-6993-1 (2007)
- Szemerényi, Oswald (1996). Introduction to Indo-European Linguistics. Oxford: Oxford University Press.
- Trask, R. L. (1996). Historical Linguistics. New York: Oxford University Press.
- Yakubovich, I. (1998). Nostratic studies in Russia
