= Aharon Dolgopolsky =

Russian-Israeli linguist (1930–2012)

- אהרון דולגופולסקי
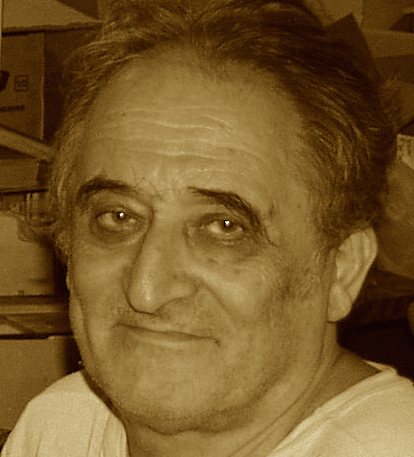
- Aharon Dolgopolsky
- Born: 18 November 1930; Moscow, Russia
- Died: 20 July 2012 (aged 81); Haifa, Israel
- Occupation: Linguist

Academic work
- Main interests: Historical linguistics

Aharon Dolgopolsky, also spelled Aron (Hebrew: אהרון דולגופולסקי, Russian: Арон Борисович Долгопольский; 18 November 1930 – 20 July 2012), was a Russian-Israeli linguist who is known as one of the modern founders of comparative Nostratic linguistics.

== Biography ==
Born in Moscow, he arrived at the long-forgotten Nostratic hypothesis in the 1960s, at around the same time but independently of Vladislav Illich-Svitych. Together with Illich-Svitych, he was the first to undertake a multilateral comparison of the supposed daughter languages of Nostratic. Teaching Nostratics at Moscow University for 8 years, Dolgopolsky moved to Israel in 1976, and taught at the University of Haifa.

Dolgopolsky was featured in the 1994 NOVA documentary, In search of the first language.

He died on 20 July 2012 in Haifa.

== See also ==
- Dolgopolsky list
- Moscow School of Comparative Linguistics
