= Salampasu language =

Bantu language spoken in DR Congo

Salampasu
- Chisalampasu
- Native to: Democratic Republic of the Congo
- Region: Copperbelt
- Native speakers: (60,000 cited 1977)
- Language family: Niger–Congo?: Atlantic–Congo; Benue–Congo; Bantoid; Bantu (Zone L); Lunda (L.50); Salampasu
- Dialects: Luntu

Language codes
- ISO 639-3: slx
- Glottolog: sala1268
- Guthrie code: L.51,511

Salampasu (Luntu) is a Bantu language of the Democratic Republic of the Congo.

Maho (2009) considers the Luntu variety to be a distinct language.
