= Lunda Sharif =

Coordinates: 31°39′41″N 70°46′7″E

- Town and union council
- Interactive map of Lunda Sharif
- Country: Pakistan
- Province: Khyber Pakhtunkhwa
- District: Dera Ismail Khan District
- Time zone: UTC+5 (PST)

Lunda Sharif is a town and union council of Dera Ismail Khan District in Khyber Pakhtunkhwa province of Pakistan. It is located at 31°39'41N 70°46'7E and has an altitude of 157 metres (518 feet).
