= Lunda, Färingsö parish =

Coordinates: 59°25′2″N 17°37′9″E

Lunda, Färingsö församling
- Smaller locality
- Interactive map of Lunda, Färingsö församling
- Country: Sweden
- County: Stockholm County
- Municipality: Ekerö Municipality
- Time zone: UTC+1 (CET)
  - Summer (DST): UTC+2 (CEST)

Lunda, Färingsö församling is a village (smaller locality) in Ekerö Municipality, Stockholm County, southeastern Sweden.
