= Kusunda =

Kusunda may refer to:

- Kusunda people, an ethnic group in western Nepal
- Kusunda language, their language
