= Illich-Svitych's law =

Proto-Slavic sound law

In linguistics, Illich-Svitych's law refers to two Proto-Slavic rules, named after Vladislav Illich-Svitych who first identified and explained them.

== Neuter o-stems ==
Proto-Slavic neuter o-stems with fixed accent on a non-acute root (accent paradigm b) become masculine, retaining the accent paradigm. Compare:

- PIE *dʰwórom n > OCS dvorъ m
- PIE *médʰu n 'mead' > PSl. *medu m (OCS medъ)

This rule is important because it operated after the influx of Proto-Germanic/Gothic thematic neuters, which all became masculines in Proto-Slavic. Late Proto-Germanic (after the operation of Verner's law) had fixed accent on the first syllable. Compare:

- PSl. *xlěvъ m 'pigsty' (OCS хлѣвъ) < PGm. *hlaiwą n
- PSl. *xysъ or *xyzъ m 'house' (attested derivatives PSl. *xyša and *xyža) < PGm. *hūsą n
- PSl. *pъlkъ m 'folk, people' (OCS плъкъ) < PGm. *fulką n

== Masculine o-stems ==
Proto-Slavic masculine o-stems with fixed accent on a non-acute root (accent paradigm b) become mobile-accent (accent paradigm c). This change is also termed "Holzer's metatony", after linguist Georg Holzer who described it.

Older literature suggests that this was not a Common Slavic innovation, and that there are exceptions in some Croatian Čakavian dialects of Susak and Istria, which have retained the original accentuation. This has been recently disputed.
