= Lunda languages =

Bantu language clade

Lunda
- Linguistic classification: Niger–Congo?: Atlantic–Congo; Benue–Congo; Southern Bantoid; Bantu (Zone L.50); Lunda

Language codes
- Glottolog: ruun1239

The Lunda languages are a clade of Bantu languages coded Zone L.50 in Guthrie's classification. According to Nurse & Philippson (2003), the languages form a valid node. They are:

Lunda, Salampasu, Ruund
