= Ruund language =

Bantu language spoken in DR Congo and Angola

Ruund
- Chiluwunda
- Native to: Democratic Republic of the Congo, Angola
- Region: Copperbelt
- Native speakers: (250,000 cited 2000)
- Language family: Niger–Congo?: Atlantic–Congo; Benue–Congo; Bantoid; Bantu (Zone L); Lunda (L.50); Ruund

Language codes
- ISO 639-3: rnd
- Glottolog: ruun1238
- Guthrie code: L.53

Ruund (Ruwund), also known as Northern Lunda or Uruund, is a Bantu language of the Democratic Republic of the Congo and Angola. It is highly unusual among Bantu languages for allowing consonantal codas and for its reduced vowel system, in which short /e/ and /o/ have become [i] and [a] respectively, leaving only 3 short vowels.

Another interesting feature of Ruund is that, as with the related Ciluba language, the tones of Proto-Bantu have reversed, so that High has become Low and vice versa. In this language therefore the accented syllables are Low and the default tone is High.
