= Apostolic Prefecture of Lower Congo =

Catholic church in Africa

Religion
- Affiliation: Roman Catholic

Location
- Location: Central Africa's Congo Basin

The Apostolic Prefecture of Lower Congo (or Apostolic Prefecture of Portuguese Congo) was a Roman Catholic pre-diocesan missionary jurisdiction in Central Africa's Congo Basin.

== History ==
The Apostolic Prefecture of Lower Congo, an exempt jurisdiction (i.e. directly subject to the Holy See), was established in 1640 on colonial territory split off from the then Roman Catholic Diocese of São Paulo de Loanda in then Portuguese Congo.

On 22 November 1886, it lost territory to establish the Mission sui juris of Belgian Congo (alias Belgisch Kongo or Congo Belge, the official names of the meanwhile explored Belgian colony). Still in 1886, the remainder was renamed as Apostolic Prefecture of Lower Congo in Cubango

In 1900 it lost territory again, to establish the Mission sui juris of Lunda (alias Mlundi).

On 4 September 1940, it was suppressed and its territory merged into the Roman Catholic Archdiocese of Luanda, in then still Portuguese Angola.

== Incumbents ==
(all Roman Rite and missionary members of the Latin Congregation of the Holy Spirit C.S.Sp.)

Apostolic Prefect of Lower Congo

- Ignace Schwindenhammer, C.S.Sp. (1866.01.14 – 1881), also Superior General of the Holy Ghost Fathers (Spiritans, Congregation of the Holy Spirit) (1853.02.10 – 1881)

Apostolic Prefects of Lower Congo in Cubango

- Pascal Campana, C.S.Sp. (1887.12.11 – 1901.12.26)
- Faustino Moreira dos Santos, C.S.Sp. (1919.06.01 – 1941.01.28), afterward Bishop of Santiago de Cabo Verde (Cape Verde) (1941.01.28 – 1955.07.27)

== See also ==
- Catholic Church in Africa
