= Eskimo–Uralic languages =

Proposed language family including Uralic and Eskaleut languages

Eskimo–Uralic
- (Neither widely accepted nor widely rejected)
- Geographic distribution: northern Eurasia and far northern America
- Linguistic classification: Proposed language family
- Subdivisions: Uralic; Eskimo–Aleut

Language codes
- Glottolog: None
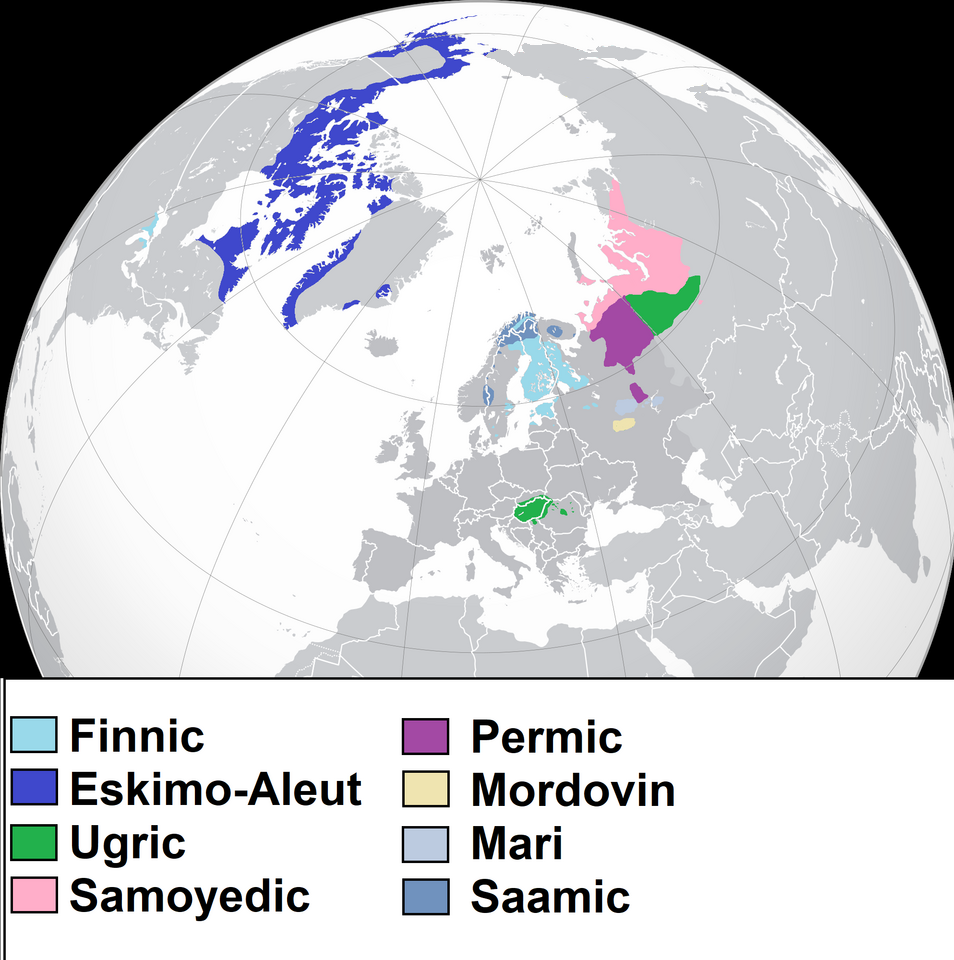
- Eskimo–Uralic languages

The Eskimo–Uralic hypothesis posits that the Uralic and Eskimo–Aleut language families belong to a common macrofamily. Eskimo-Uralic is the oldest proposal which connects the Eskaleut languages to other language families, which was suggested quickly after European contacts with the Inuit. In 1818, the Danish linguist Rasmus Rask grouped together the languages of Greenlandic and Finnish. The Eskimo–Uralic hypothesis was put forward by Knut Bergsland in 1959, and the expanded Uralo-Siberian theory which includes the Yukaghir languages was proposed by Michael Fortescue in 1998.

Linguists such as Ante Aikio believe that some relationship existing between Eskaleut and Uralic languages is likely, although exact conclusions about the nature of the relationship cannot be proven, whereas others, such as Stefan Georg, consider the evidence too weak to suspect even the possibility of borrowing between Uralic and Eskaleut languages. Alexander Vovin, generally considered a skeptic of long-range macrofamilial hypotheses, described a 2001 work by Uwe Seefloth as convincing him beyond a reasonable doubt that the connection was legitimate.

== History ==
Comparisons between Uralic and Eskimo–Aleut languages were made early. In 1746, the Danish theologian Marcus Wøldike compared Greenlandic to Hungarian. In 1818, Rasmus Rask considered Greenlandic to be related to the Uralic languages, Finnish in particular, and presented a list of lexical correspondences (Rask also considered Uralic and Altaic to be related to each other). In 1871, H. Rink made a similar proposal. In 1959, Knut Bergsland published the paper The Eskimo–Uralic Hypothesis, in which he, like other authors before him, presented a number of grammatical similarities and a small number of lexical correspondences, comparing Finnish, Saami and Eskaleut languages.

In 1998, Michael Fortescue presented more detailed arguments in his book, Language Relations across Bering Strait. His title evokes Morris Swadesh's 1962 article, "Linguistic relations across the Bering Strait". Besides new proposed linguistic evidence, Fortescue (2016) presents several genetic studies that he argued to support a common origin of the included groups, with a suggested homeland in Northeast Asia.

== Proposed evidence ==
A few potential lexical cognates between Proto-Uralic and Eskimo–Aleut are pointed out in Aikio (2019: 53–54). These are:

Proto-Uralic	Proto-Eskimo
*ila- 'place under or below'	*at(ǝ)- 'down'; *alaq 'sole'
*elä- 'to live'	*ǝt(ǝ)- 'to be'
*tuli- 'to come'	*tut- 'to arrive, land'; *tulaɣ-
*kuda 'morning, dawn'	*qilaɣ- 'sky'
*kuda- 'to weave'	*qilaɣ- 'to knit, weave'

A possible regular sound correspondence with Uralic *-l- and Proto-Eskimo-Aleut *-t can be argued to exist.

According to Ante Aikio, the words 'morning' and 'to weave' appear to be completely unrelated, which means there is an instance of coincidental homonymy, which very rarely happens by accident. Aikio thus states that he believes it to be likely that there is some connection between the two families, however exact conclusions cannot be drawn.

Below are some lexical items compared by Fortescue in Proto-Uralic and Proto-Eskaleut (sometimes Proto-Eskimo or Aleut). (Source: Fortescue 1998:152–158.)

Proto-Uralic	Proto-Eskaleut
*aja- 'drive, chase'	*ajaɣ- 'push, thrust at with pole'
*appe 'father in law'	*ap(p)a 'grandfather'
*elä 'not'	*-la(ɣ)- 'not' (A)
*pitV- 'tie' (FU)	*pətuɣ- 'tie up'
*toɣe- 'bring, take, give' (FU)	*teɣu- 'take' (PE)

Proto-Uralic and Proto-Eskaleut number and case markers:

	Proto-Uralic	Proto-Eskaleut
nom./absolutive sing.	Ø	Ø
dual	*-kə	*k
plural	*-t	*-t
locative	*-(kə)na	*-ni
accusative sing	*-m	–
plural accusative	*-j/i	*-(ŋ)i
ablative	*-(kə)tə	*-kənc
dative/lative	*-kə/-ŋ	*-ŋun

== Linguistic relationships ==
A similar theory was suggested in 1998 by Michael Fortescue, in his book Language Relations across Bering Strait where he proposed the Uralo-Siberian theory, which, unlike the Eskimo-Uralic hypothesis includes the Yukaghir languages. Building upon Fortescue's Uralo-Siberian theory, the University of Leiden linguist Frederik Kortlandt (2006:1) asserted that Indo-Uralic (a proposed language family consisting of Uralic and Indo-European) is itself a branch of Uralo-Siberian and that, furthermore, the Nivkh language also belongs to Uralo-Siberian.

Fortescue's observations have been evaluated by specialists with a limited degree of positivity but are viewed as scattered evidence and still remain highly speculative and unproven and the soundness of the reconstructed common ancestors are challenging to evaluate. While Ante Aikio has strongly rejected the connection between Uralic and Yukaghir, he has nevertheless stated that it is likely that there is some connection between the Eskaleut languages and the Uralic languages, but exact conclusions about the nature of this connection cannot presently be drawn.

According to Stefan Georg, at present the arguments used to defend the Eskimo-Uralic theory are insufficient to suspect a relationship between the languages, or necessarily even to make an affirmative case for their relationship.

== See also ==
- Paleosiberian languages
- Proto-Chukotko-Kamchatkan language
- Proto-Uralic language
- Classification of indigenous languages of the Americas
- Linguistic areas of the Americas
- Macrofamily
