= Paleo-Siberian languages =

Group of languages in Siberia

Paleo-Siberian
- (Proposed under study)
- Geographic distribution: Siberia
- Linguistic classification: Not a single family
- Subdivisions: Chukotko-Kamchatkan; Nivkh; Yeniseian; Yukaghir

Language codes
- Orthographic projection of Siberia with the distribution of the Paleo-Siberian languages c. 1600 AD; Siberia; Chukotko-Kamchatkan; Nivkh; Yeniseian; Yukaghir

The Paleo-Siberian languages are four groups of language isolates and small language families spoken in parts of Siberia. They are not known to have any genetic relationship to each other; their only widely accepted link is that they are held to have antedated the more dominant languages, particularly Tungusic and latterly Turkic languages, that have largely displaced them. More recently, Turkic (at least in Siberia) and Tungusic have been displaced in their turn by Russian.

== Classifications ==
Four small language families and isolates are usually considered to be Paleo-Siberian languages:

1. The Chukotko-Kamchatkan family, sometimes known as Luoravetlan, includes Chukchi and its close relatives, Koryak, Alutor and Kerek. Itelmen, also known as Kamchadal, is also distantly related. Chukchi, Koryak and Alutor are spoken in easternmost Siberia by communities numbering in the thousands (Chukchi) or hundreds (Koryak and Alutor). Kerek is extinct, and Itelmen is now spoken by fewer than 5 people, mostly elderly, on the west coast of the Kamchatka Peninsula.
2. Nivkh (Gilyak, Amuric) consists of two or three languages spoken in the lower Amur basin and on the northern half of Sakhalin island. It has a recent modern literature.
3. The Yeniseian languages were a small family formerly spoken on the middle Yenisei River and its tributaries, but are now represented only by Ket, spoken in the Turukhansky District of Krasnoyarsk Krai by no more than 200 people.
4. Yukaghir is spoken in two mutually unintelligible varieties in the lower Kolyma and Indigirka valleys. Other languages, including Chuvan, spoken further inland and further east, are now extinct. Yukaghir is held by some to be related to the Uralic languages.

On the basis of morphological, typological, and lexical evidence, Michael Fortescue suggests that Chukotko-Kamchatkan and Nivkh (Amuric) are related, forming a larger Chukotko-Kamchatkan–Amuric language family. Fortescue does not consider Yeniseian and Yukaghir to be genetically related to Chukotko-Kamchatkan–Amuric.

== Relationships ==
The purpose of the existence of Paleo-Siberian itself lies in its practicability and remains a grouping of convenience for a variety of unclassifiable language isolates located in Northeast Eurasia.

The almost-extinct Yeniseian language family, primarily through the Ket language, has been linked to the Na-Dené languages of North America. Dené–Yeniseian has been called "the first demonstration of a genealogical link between Old World and New World language families that meets the standards of traditional comparative-historical linguistics". Attempts to connect it to Sino-Tibetan, North Caucasian and Burushaski have also been made, especially through the widely-discredited Dené-Caucasian hypothesis.

Kim Bang-han proposed that placename glosses in the Samguk sagi reflect the original language of the Korean peninsula and a component in the formation of both Korean and Japanese. It is suggested that this language was related to Nivkh in some form. Juha Janhunen suggests the possibility that similar consonant stop systems in Koreanic and Nivkh may be due to ancient contact. Martine Robbeets suggests that Proto-Korean had a Nivkh substrate influence. Further parallel developments in their sound inventory (Old to Middle Korean and Proto-Nivkh to Nivkh) as well as commonalities in the syntax between Koreanic and Nivkh specifically have been observed. Alexander Vovin, in a criticism of the Altaic language grouping, has suggested that Korean shares similarities with other Paleo-Siberian languages in several important respects (i.e. phonotactics, verb incorporation v. compounding, adjectives as verbs and not nominals).

The Ob-Ugric and Samoyedic languages predate the spread of Turkic, Mongolic and Tungusic languages, but are part of the well established larger Uralic family, thus not Paleo-Siberian. Yukaghir has often been suggested as a more distant relative of Uralic as part of the Uralic–Yukaghir languages, as well as Eskimo-Aleut as part of the Uralo-Siberian languages.

== Vocabulary comparison ==
Below are selected basic vocabulary items in proto-languages reconstructed for Paleo-Siberian languages and language families. Proto-Eskimo, Proto-Uralic, Proto-Ainu, Ainu, Proto-Korean and Proto-Japonic are also given for comparison.

gloss	Proto-Yeniseian	Proto-Uralic	Proto-Eskimo	Proto-Yukaghir	Proto-Chukotko-Kamchatkan	Proto-Nivkh	Proto-Korean	Proto-Ainu	Ainu	Proto-Japonic
head	*cɨʔɢ-; *kəŕga-	*ojwa	*nay(ə)quʀ	*joː	C *læwət	*d’oŋkr	*matuy	*pa; *sa	pa	*tumu-; *kàsìrà
hair	*cəŋe	*apte	*nuyaʀ	*manilə/*monilə	C *kəðwir	*ŋamrki	*kar(ák); tǝrǝk	*numa		*ká-Ci
eye	*de-s	*śilmä	*əðə	*waŋ-/*woŋ-; *jöː-	*ləlæ	*n’(ə)ŋaɣ	*nún	*sik; *nuu	shik	*mà-n
ear	*ʔɔqtʌ ~ *ʔɔgde	*peljä	*ciɣun	*unemə	*vilu	*mla; *nor	*kúj	*kisAr	kisar	*mìmì
nose	*ʔolk-; *xaŋ	*nere (*nēre)	*qəqaʀ	*jöː-	*qiN(qiN); C *jeqa	*wiɣ	*kóh	*Etu	etu	*páná
tooth		*piŋe	*kəɣun	*toð-; *sal’qəriː	C *wannə	*ŋaɣzər	*ni(s)	*nii; *ima(=)k	nimaki	*pà
tongue	*ʔej	*kele (*kēle)	I *uqaq(-)	*wonor	*jilə(jil) ?	*hilɣ	*hyet/*hita	*agu	parumbe	*sìtà
mouth	*χowe	*śuwe	*qanəʀ(-)	*aŋa	*rəkərNə(n)	*amɣ	*ip/*kút	*prAA=	par	*kútú-Ci
hand	*pʌg-	*käte	*aðɣa(ʀ), *aðɣaɣ	*ńuŋkən/*ńuŋen	*kæɣ(ə)	*damk	*són/tar	*tE(=)k	tek	*tà-Ci
foot	*kiʔs; *bul	*jalka	*itəɣaʀ	*noj-; *ar-	*kətka	*ŋazl	*pál	*urE; *kEma; *tikir	ure	*pànkì
breast	*təga	*poŋe	*əvyaŋ(ŋ)iʀ	*sis-; *mel-	*loloʀ(ə)	*məc(ɣ)	*cǝc	*tOO[C]		*ti/*titi
meat	*ʔise	*pećä; *siwɜ-ĺɜ	*kəməɣ; *uvinəɣ	*čuː-	C *kinuNi; C *tərɣətər	*dur	*kòkí	*kam	kam	shishi
blood	*sur	*wire	*aðuɣ, *kanuɣ	*lep(k)-; *čeːmə	*mullə(mul)	cʰoχ; ŋær̥	*pVhi	*kEm	kem	*tí
bone	*ʔaʔd	*luwe	I *caunəq	*am-	*qətʀəm	ŋɨɲf	*sùpyé	*ponE	pone	*pone
person	*keʔt; *pixe	*inše	(*inguɣ; *taʁu 'shamanic')	*köntə; *soromə	*qəlavol ?; *qəlik 'male'; C *ʀoraNvərr(at)əlʀən	*n’iɣvŋ	*sarʌm	*kur	(ainu)	*pítò̱
name	*ʔiɢ	*nime	*atəʀ; *acciʀ-	*ńuː; *kirijə	C *nənnə	*qa(-)	*ìlh(kòt)tá/*na	*dEE	rei	*ná
dog	*čip ~ *čib	*pene	*qikmiʀ	*laːmə	*qətʀə(n)	*ɢanŋ	*kahi	*gita	seta	*ìnù
fish		*kala	*iqałuɣ	*an-/*wan-; *anjə ?	*ənnə	*co	*mǝlkòkí	*tiqEp	chep	*(d)íwó
louse	*jog- ~ *jok 'nit'	*täje	*kumaɣ	*peme/*pime	*mə(l)məl	*dar, *hirk; *amrak	*ni	*ki	ki	*sìrámí
tree		*puwɜ	*uqviɣ; *napa(ʀ)aqtuʀ	*saː-	*ut(tə)	*d’iɣar	*nàmò̱k(ó)	*nii; *tiku=	ni	*kò̱- < *ko̱no̱r
leaf	*jə̄pe	*lešte; *lȣ̈pɜ (*lepɜ)	*pəłu	*pöɣ-	*wətwət	*blaŋ(q), *d’omr	*nip	*hrA=	ham	*pá
flower		*ćȣrɜ (Mansi)		*polčičə		ɤŋvk	*kòcʌ́	*Epuy	epuige	*páná
water	*xur	*wete	*imaqtəq-	*law-	*(m)iməl ?	*caʀ	*mǝí	*hdak=ka	wakka	*mí
fire	*boʔk	*tule	*ək(ə)nəʀ	*loč-	*jən ?; *milɣə(mil)	*tuɣ(u)r	*pɨr	*apE	abe	*pò-Ci
stone	*čɨʔs	*kiwe	*qaluʀ; *uyaʀaɣ	*söj-/*sej-	*ɣəv(ɣəv)	*baʀ	*tərək	*suma; *pOqina	shuma	*(d)ísò
earth	*baʔŋ	*maγe	*nuna, *nunałit-	*luk-; *öninč’ə	*nutæ ? 'land'	*miv	*nu(r)i	*tOy	toi	*tùtì 'land'
salt	*čəʔ	*salɜ (*sala)	*taʀ(ə)yuʀ			*davc(iŋ)	*sokom	*sippO	shippo	
road	*qoʔt	*teje		*čuɣö; *jaw-	*rəʀet; *təlanvə 'way'	*d’iv	*kil	*truu	ru	*mítí < honorific prefix mi- + ti 'road'
eat	*siɢ-	*sewe- (*seγe-)		*leɣ-	*nu-	*n’i-	*mǝk-	*EE	ibe	*kup-
die	*qɔ-	*kola-	*tuqu(-)	*am-/*wam-	C *viʀ-	*mu	*cuk-	*day	rai	*sín-
I	*ʔadᶻ	*mȣ̈	*uvaŋa; (*vi)	*mət	*kəm	*n’i	*na/uri	*ku=	kuani	*bàn[u]
you	*ʔaw ~ ʔu; *kʌ- ~ *ʔʌk-	*tȣ̈	*əlpət, *əłvət	*tit	*kəð; *tur(i)	*ci	*ne	*E=	eani	*si/*so̱-; *na

Notes: C = Proto-Chukotian; I = Proto-Inuit

== See also ==
- Dene-Yeniseian languages
- Eurasiatic languages
- Ostyak, a Russian name for indigenous languages of Siberia
- Uralo-Siberian languages
