= Ural-Altaic languages =

Language family

Ural-Altaic
- Turanian
- (obsolete as a genealogical proposal)
- Geographic distribution: Eurasia
- Linguistic classification: convergence zone
- Proto-language: Proto-Ural-Altaic
- Subdivisions: Uralic; Turkic; Mongolic; Tungusic; (2–4 = Altaic); Yukaghir

Language codes
- Glottolog: None
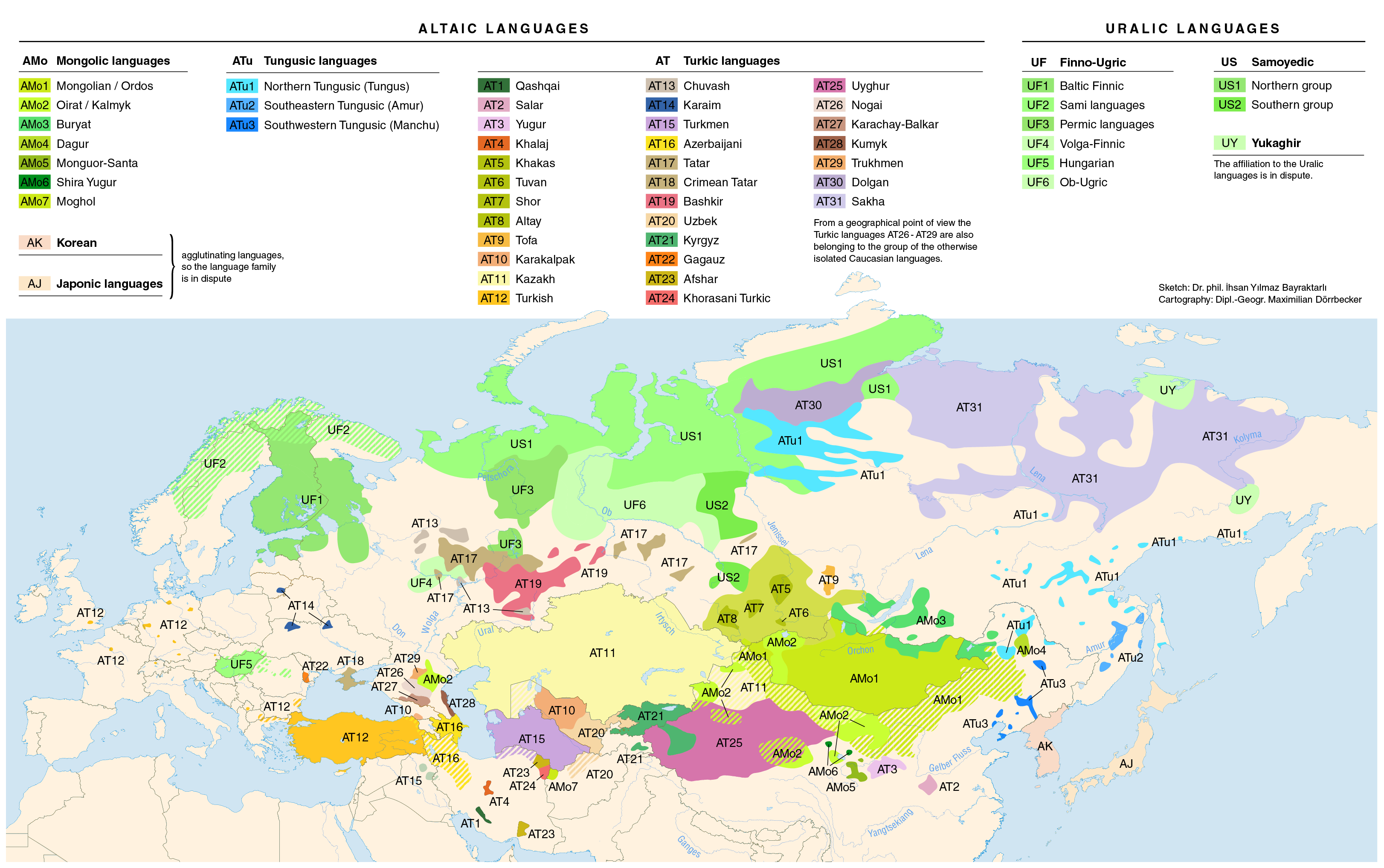
- Distribution of Uralic, Altaic, and Yukaghir languages

Ural-Altaic or Uralo-Altaic is a linguistic convergence zone and abandoned language-family proposal uniting the Uralic and the Altaic (in the narrow sense) languages. It is now generally agreed that even the Altaic languages do not share a common descent: the similarities between Turkic, Mongolic and Tungusic are better explained by diffusion and borrowing. Just as in Altaic, the internal structure of the Uralic family has been debated since the family was first proposed. Doubts about the validity of most or all of the proposed higher-order Uralic branchings (grouping the nine undisputed families) are becoming more common. The term continues to be used for the central Eurasian typological, grammatical and lexical convergence zone.

Indeed, "Ural-Altaic" may be preferable to "Altaic" in this sense. For example, J. Janhunen states that "speaking of 'Altaic' instead of 'Ural-Altaic' is a misconception, for there are no areal or typological features that are specific to 'Altaic' without Uralic." Originally suggested in the 18th century, the genealogical and racial hypotheses remained debated into the mid-20th century, often with disagreements exacerbated by pan-nationalist agendas.

The Ural-Altaic hypothesis had multiple proponents in the United Kingdom. Since the 1960s, the proposed language family has been widely rejected. A relationship between the Altaic, Indo-European and Uralic families was revived in the context of the Nostratic hypothesis, which was popular for a time, with for example Allan Bomhard treating Uralic, Altaic and Indo-European as coordinate branches. However, Nostratic too is now rejected.

== History as a hypothesized language family ==
The concept of a Ural-Altaic ethnic and language family goes back to the linguistic theories of Gottfried Wilhelm Leibniz; in his opinion there was no better method for specifying the relationship and origin of the various peoples of the Earth, than the comparison of their languages. In his Brevis designatio meditationum de originibus gentium ductis potissimum ex indicio linguarum, written in 1710, he originates every human language from one common ancestor language. Over time, this ancestor language split into two families; the Japhetic and the Aramaic. The Japhetic family split even further, into Scythian and Celtic branches. The members of the Scythian family were: the Greek language, the family of Sarmato-Slavic languages (Russian, Polish, Czech, Dalmatian, Bulgar, Slovene, Avar and Khazar), the family of Turkic languages (Turkish, Cuman, Kalmyk and Mongolian), the family of Finno-Ugric languages (Finnish, Saami, Hungarian, Estonian, Liv and Samoyed). Although his theory and grouping were far from perfect, they had a considerable effect on the development of linguistic research, especially in German-speaking countries.

In his book An historico-geographical description of the north and east parts of Europe and Asia, published in 1730, Philip Johan von Strahlenberg, Swedish prisoner-of-war and explorer of Siberia, who accompanied Daniel Gottlieb Messerschmidt on his expeditions, described Finno-Ugric, Turkic, Samoyedic, Mongolic, Tungusic and Caucasian peoples as sharing linguistic and cultural commonalities. 20th century scholarship has on several occasions incorrectly credited him with proposing a Ural-Altaic language family, though he does not claim linguistic affinity between any of the six groups. (Note: According to Manaster Ramer & Sidwell, this misconception first dates back to a 1901 article by Otto Donner, later most prominently repeated by Nicholas Poppe, Merritt Ruhlen and G. D. Sanzheev.)

Danish philologist Rasmus Christian Rask described what he called "Scythian" languages in 1834, which included Finno-Ugric, Turkic, Samoyedic, Eskimo, Caucasian, Basque and others.

The Ural-Altaic hypothesis was elaborated at least as early as 1836 by W. Schott and in 1838 by F. J. Wiedemann.

The "Altaic" hypothesis, as mentioned by Finnish linguist and explorer Matthias Castrén by 1844, included the Finno-Ugric and Samoyedic, grouped as "Chudic", and Turkic, Mongolic, and Tungusic, grouped as "Tataric". Subsequently, in the latter half of the 19th century, Turkic, Mongolic, and Tungusic came to be referred to as Altaic languages, whereas Finno-Ugric and Samoyedic were called Uralic. The similarities between these two families led to their retention in a common grouping, named Ural–Altaic.

Friedrich Max Müller, the German Orientalist and philologist, published and proposed a new grouping of the non-Aryan and non-Semitic Asian languages in 1855. In his work The Languages of the Seat of War in the East, he called these languages "Turanian". Müller divided this group into two subgroups, the Southern Division, and the Northern Division. In the long run, his evolutionist theory about languages' structural development, tying growing grammatical refinement to socio-economic development, and grouping languages into 'antediluvian', 'familial', 'nomadic', and 'political' developmental stages, proved unsound, but his Northern Division was renamed and re-classed as the "Ural-Altaic languages".

Between the 1850s and 1870s, there were efforts by Frederick Roehrig to including some Native American languages in a "Turanian" or "Ural-Altaic" family, and between the 1870s and 1890s, there was speculation about links with Basque.

In Hungary, where the national language is Uralic but with heavy historical Turkic influence—a fact which by itself spurred the popularity of the "Ural-Altaic" hypothesis—the idea of the Ural–Altaic relationship remained widely implicitly accepted in the late 19th and the mid-20th century, though more out of pan-nationalist than linguistic reasons, and without much detailed research carried out. Elsewhere the notion had sooner fallen into discredit, with Ural–Altaic supporters elsewhere such as the Finnish Altaicist Martti Räsänen being in the minority. The contradiction between Hungarian linguists' convictions and the lack of clear evidence eventually provided motivation for scholars such as Aurélien Sauvageot and Denis Sinor to carry out more detailed investigation of the hypothesis, which so far has failed to yield generally accepted results. Nicholas Poppe in his article The Uralo-Altaic Theory in the Light of the Soviet Linguistics (1940) also attempted to refute Castrén's views by showing that the common agglutinating features may have arisen independently.

Beginning in the 1960s, the hypothesis came to be seen even more controversial, due to the Altaic family itself also falling out universal acceptance. Today, the hypothesis that Uralic and Altaic are related more closely to one another than to any other family has almost no adherents. In his Altaic Etymological Dictionary, co-authored with Anna V. Dybo and Oleg A. Mudrak, Sergei Starostin characterized the Ural–Altaic hypothesis as "an idea now completely discarded". There are, however, a number of hypotheses that propose a larger macrofamily including Uralic, Altaic and other families. None of these hypotheses has widespread support. In Starostin's sketch of a "Borean" super-phylum, he puts Uralic and Altaic as daughters of an ancestral language of c. 9,000 years ago from which the Dravidian languages and the Paleo-Siberian languages, including Eskimo–Aleut, are also descended. He posits that this ancestral language, together with Indo-European and Kartvelian, descends from a "Eurasiatic" protolanguage some 12,000 years ago, which in turn would be descended from a "Borean" protolanguage via Nostratic.

In the 1980s, Russian linguist N. D. Andreev (Nikolai Dmitrievich Andreev) proposed a "Boreal languages" hypothesis linking the Indo-European, Uralic, and Altaic (including Korean in his later papers) language families. Andreev also proposed 203 lexical roots for his hypothesized Boreal macrofamily. After Andreev's death in 1997, the Boreal hypothesis was further expanded by Sorin Paliga (2003, 2007).

== Typology ==
There is general agreement on several typological similarities being widely found among the languages considered under Ural–Altaic:

- head-final and subject–object–verb word order
- in most of the languages, vowel harmony
- morphology that is predominantly agglutinative and suffixing
- zero copula
- non-finite clauses
- lack of grammatical gender
- lack of consonant clusters in word-initial position
- having a separate verb for existential clause which is different from ordinary possession verbs like "to have"

Such similarities do not constitute sufficient evidence of genetic relationship all on their own, as other explanations are possible. Juha Janhunen has argued that although Ural–Altaic is to be rejected as a genealogical relationship, it remains a viable concept as a well-defined language area, which in his view has formed through the historical interaction and convergence of four core language families (Uralic, Turkic, Mongolic and Tungusic), and their influence on the more marginal Korean and Japonic.

Contrasting views on the typological situation have been presented by other researchers. Michael Fortescue has connected Uralic instead as a part of a Uralo-Siberian typological area (comprising Uralic, Yukaghir, Chukotko-Kamchatkan and Eskimo–Aleut), contrasting with a more narrowly defined Altaic typological area; while Anderson has outlined a specifically Siberian language area, including within Uralic only the Ob-Ugric and Samoyedic groups; within Altaic most of the Tungusic family as well as Siberian Turkic and Buryat (Mongolic); as well as Yukaghir, Chukotko-Kamchatkan, Eskimo–Aleut, Nivkh, and Yeniseian.

== Relationship between Uralic and Altaic ==
The Altaic language family was generally accepted by linguists from the late 19th century up to the 1960s, but since then has been in dispute. For simplicity's sake, the following discussion assumes the validity of the Altaic language family.

Two senses should be distinguished in which Uralic and Altaic might be related.

1. Do Uralic and Altaic have a demonstrable genetic relationship?
2. If they do have a demonstrable genetic relationship, do they form a valid linguistic taxon? For example, Germanic and Iranian have a genetic relationship via Proto-Indo-European, but they do not form a valid taxon within the Indo-European language family, whereas in contrast Iranian and Indo-Aryan do via Indo-Iranian, a daughter language of Proto-Indo-European that subsequently calved into Indo-Aryan and Iranian.

In other words, showing a genetic relationship does not suffice to establish a language family, such as the proposed Ural–Altaic family; it is also necessary to consider whether other languages from outside the proposed family might not be at least as closely related to the languages in that family as the latter are to each other. This distinction is often overlooked but is fundamental to the genetic classification of languages. Some linguists indeed maintain that Uralic and Altaic are related through a larger family, such as Eurasiatic or Nostratic, within which Uralic and Altaic are no more closely related to each other than either is to any other member of the proposed family, for instance than Uralic or Altaic is to Indo-European (for example Greenberg).

=== Shared vocabulary ===
To demonstrate the existence of a language family, it is necessary to find cognate words that trace back to a common proto-language. Shared vocabulary alone does not show a relationship, as it may be loaned from one language to another or through the language of a third party.

There are shared words between, for example, Turkic and Ugric languages, or Tungusic and Samoyedic languages, which are explainable by borrowing. However, it has been difficult to find Ural–Altaic words shared across all involved language families. Such words should be found in all branches of the Uralic and Altaic trees and should follow regular sound changes from the proto-language to known modern languages, and regular sound changes from Proto-Ural–Altaic to give Proto-Uralic and Proto-Altaic words should be found to demonstrate the existence of a Ural–Altaic vocabulary. Instead, candidates for Ural–Altaic cognate sets can typically be supported by only one of the Altaic subfamilies. In contrast, about 200 Proto-Uralic word roots are known and universally accepted, and for the proto-languages of the Altaic subfamilies and the larger main groups of Uralic, on the order of 1000–2000 words can be recovered.

Some linguists point out strong similarities in the personal pronouns of Uralic and Altaic languages, although the similarities also exist with the Indo-European pronouns as well.

The basic numerals, unlike those among the Indo-European languages (compare Proto-Indo-European numerals), are particularly divergent between all three core Altaic families and Uralic, and to a lesser extent even within Uralic.

Numeral	Uralic			Turkic	Mongolic	Tungusic
Numeral	Finnish	Hungarian	Tundra Nenets	Old Turkic	Classical Mongolian	Proto-Tungusic
1	yksi	egy	ӈобˮ (ŋob)	bir	nigen	*emün
2	kaksi	kettő/két	сидя (śiďa)	eki	qoyar	*džör
3	kolme	három	няхарˮ (ńax°r)	üs	ɣurban	*ilam
4	neljä	négy	тет (ťet°)	tört	dörben	*dügün
5	viisi	öt	самляӈг (səmp°ľaŋk°)	baš	tabun	*tuńga
6	kuusi	hat	матˮ (mət°ʔ)	eltı	ǰirɣuɣan	*ńöŋün
7	seitsemän	hét	сиˮив (śīʔw°)	jeti	doluɣan	*nadan
8	kahdeksan	nyolc	сидндет (śid°nťet°)	säkiz	naiman	*džapkun
9	yhdeksän	kilenc	хасуюˮ (xasuyu")	toquz	yisün	*xüyägün
10	kymmenen	tíz	юˮ (yūʔ)	on	arban	*džuvan

One alleged Ural-Altaic similarity among this data are the Hungarian (három) and Mongolian (ɣurban) numerals for '3'. According to Róna-Tas (1983), elevating this similarity to a hypothesis of common origin would still require several ancillary hypotheses:

- that this Finno-Ugric lexeme, and not the incompatible Samoyedic lexeme, is the original Uralic numeral;
- that this Mongolic lexeme, and not the incompatible Turkic and Tungusic lexemes, is the original Altaic numeral;
- that the Hungarian form with -r-, and not the -l- seen in cognates such as in Finnish kolme, is more original;
- that -m in the Hungarian form is originally a suffix, since -bVn, found also in other Mongolian numerals, is also a suffix and not an original part of the word root;
- that the voiced spirant ɣ- in Mongolian can correspond to the voiceless stop *k- in Finno-Ugric (known to be the source of Hungarian h-).

=== Sound correspondences ===
The following consonant correspondences between Uralic and Altaic are asserted by Poppe (1983):

- Word-initial bilabial stop: Uralic *p- = Altaic *p- (> Turkic and Mongolic *h-)
- Sibilants: Uralic *s, *š, *ś = Altaic *s
- Nasals: Uralic *n, *ń, *ŋ = Altaic *n, *ń, *ŋ (in Turkic word-initial *n-, *ń- > *j-; in Mongolic *ń(V) > *n(i))
- Liquids: Uralic *-l-, *-r- = Altaic *-l-, *r- (Note: Treated only word-medially.)

== As a convergence zone ==
Regardless of a possible common origin or lack thereof, Uralic-Altaic languages can be spoken of as a convergence zone. Although it has not yet been possible to demonstrate a genetic relationship or a significant amount of common vocabulary between the languages other than loanwords, according to the linguist Juha Janhunen, the languages must have had a common linguistic homeland. The Turkic, Mongolic and Tungusic languages have been spoken in the Manchurian region, and there is little chance that a similar structural typology of Uralic languages could have emerged without close contact between them. The languages of Turkish and Finnish have a number of similar structures, such as vowel harmony and agglutination, and it has been suggested by Edward Vajda that Early Turkic may have loaned palatal harmony from Uralic.

Similarly, according to Janhunen, the common typology of the Altaic languages can be inferred as a result of mutual contacts in the past, perhaps from a few thousand years ago.

== See also ==
- Altaic languages
  - Altaic homeland
- Uralic languages
  - Uralic homeland
  - Proto-Uralic language
  - Uralic–Yukaghir languages
  - Uralo-Siberian languages
  - Indo-Uralic languages
  - Sino-Uralic languages
- Eurasiatic languages
- Nostratic languages
- Pan-Turanism

== Bibliography ==
- Greenberg, Joseph H. (2000). Indo-European and Its Closest Relatives: The Eurasiatic Language Family, Volume 1: Grammar. Stanford: Stanford University Press.
- Greenberg, Joseph H. (2005). Genetic Linguistics: Essays on Theory and Method, edited by William Croft. Oxford: Oxford University Press.
- Ponaryadov, V. V. (2011). A tentative reconstruction of Proto-Uralo-Mongolian. Syktyvkar. 44 p. (Scientific Reports / Komi Science Center of the Ural Division of the Russian Academy of Sciences; Issue 510).
- Shirokogoroff, S. M. (1931). Ethnological and Linguistical Aspects of the Ural–Altaic Hypothesis. Peiping, China: The Commercial Press.
- Sinor, Denis (1988). "The Problem of the Ural-Altaic relationship". In Sinor, Denis (ed.). The Uralic Languages: Description, History and Modern Influences. Leiden: Brill. pp. 706–741.
- Starostin, Sergei A., Anna V. Dybo, and Oleg A. Mudrak. (2003). Etymological Dictionary of the Altaic Languages. Brill Academic Publishers. ISBN 90-04-13153-1.
- Vago, R. M. (1972). Abstract Vowel Harmony Systems in Uralic and Altaic Languages. Bloomington: Indiana University Linguistics Club.
