= Turanian languages =

Obsolete language-family proposal

Turanian
- (obsolete)
- Geographic distribution: Eurasia
- Linguistic classification: Proposed language family
- Subdivisions: Northern (Ural-Altaic); Southern

Language codes
- Glottolog: None

Turanian is an obsolete language-family proposal subsuming most of the languages of Eurasia not included in Indo-European, Semitic and Chinese. During the 19th century, inspired by the establishment of the Indo-European family, scholars looked for similarly widespread families elsewhere. Building on the work of predecessors such as Rasmus Rask and Matthias Castrén, Max Müller proposed the Turanian grouping primarily on the basis of the incidence of agglutinative morphology, naming it after Turan, an ancient Persian term for the lands of Central Asia. The languages he included are now generally assigned to nine separate language families.

== Classification ==
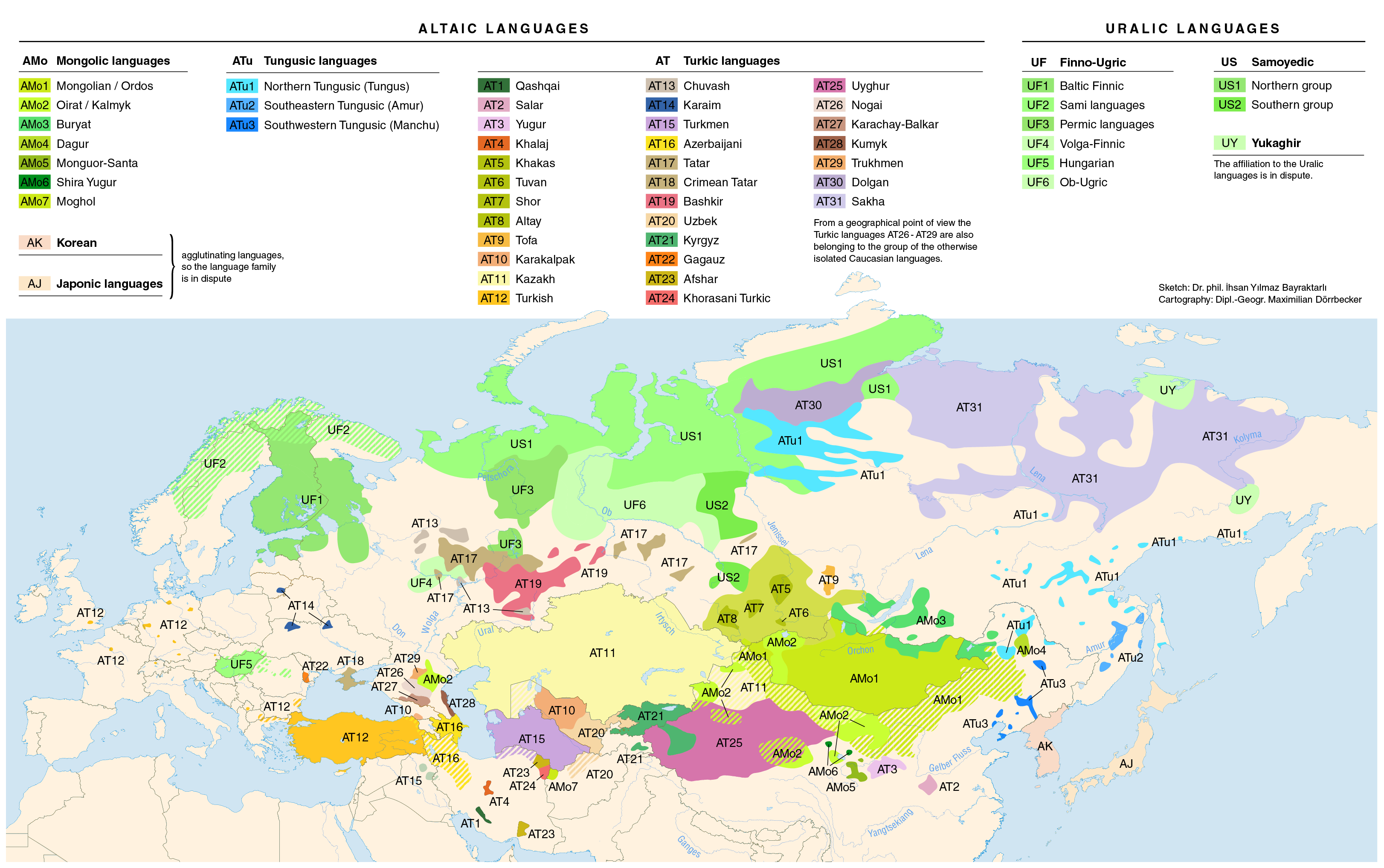
Map of Eurasia showing the "Altaic" and Uralic language-speaking regions, which are united under the "Turanian" theory.

In 1730, von Strahlenberg, relying on structural similarities of languages, proposed a group of "Tatar languages" spanning northern and central Eurasia and the languages of the Caucasus. In 1832, Rask added Basque and languages of Greenland and North America to von Strahlenberg's grouping, labelling the resulting group the "Scythian languages". Rask also added the Dravidian languages to this grouping on the basis of similarities in grammatical structure, postulating that the Scythian languages had once stretched from the Arctic Ocean to the Indian Ocean before being split by the intrusion of Indo-Aryan languages.

Müller added even more languages to this group. He viewed the structure of the family as follows:

- Turanian
  - Northern Division (Ural-Altaic)
    - Tungusic
    - Mongolic
    - Turkic
    - Samoyedic
    - Finnic
  - Southern Division
    - Taic
    - Malaic (Malayo-Polynesian)
    - Bhotîya (Tibeto-Burman)
      - Gangetic
      - Lohitic
    - Munda
    - Tamulic (Dravidian)

He left Japonic, Koreanic, Koryak, Itelmen and various languages of the Caucasus unclassified, but suggested that they might have a common origin with Turanian. He preferred to call Turanian a "language group", feeling that it was less tightly bound than "language families" like Indo-European and Semitic.

== Reception ==
Linguists no longer consider typological features a sufficient criterion for the identification of language families. Such features are commonly shared by unrelated languages across the world, and also spread by interaction between unrelated languages.

The proposal of a relationship between Ural-Altaic and Dravidian persisted in some late 19th century scholarship, but in the absence of further development, was considered an idle hypothesis already by the early 20th. The Ural-Altaic hypothesis was itself abandoned early in the 20th century. The Altaic theory linking Tungusic, Mongolic and Turkic is also rejected by most scholars. The combination of the Samoyedic and Finnic (Finno-Ugric) classes form the modern Uralic family, which is firmly established. Each of the five classes of Müller's southern division are now considered to belong to separate language families, Tai–Kadai, Austronesian, Sino-Tibetan, Austroasiatic and Dravidian respectively.

The term "Turanian" remained for a time also a synonym for the Ural-Altaic hypothesis.
