= Uralic–Yukaghir hypothesis =

Proposed language family

Uralic–Yukaghir
- Uralo–Yukaghir
- (Not widely accepted nor widely rejected)
- Geographic distribution: Northern Europe, Eastern Europe, Siberia
- Linguistic classification: Proposed language family
- Subdivisions: Uralic; Yukaghir

Language codes
- Glottolog: None
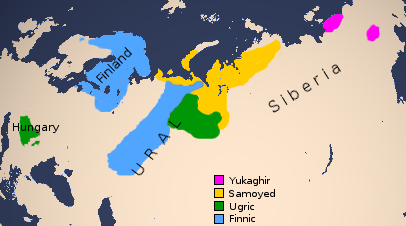
- The Uralic and Yukaghir languages

Uralic–Yukaghir, also known as Uralo-Yukaghir, is a hypothetical proposed language family composed of Uralic and Yukaghir. Uralic is a large and diverse family of languages spoken in northern and eastern Europe and northwestern Siberia. Among the better-known Uralic languages are Finnish, Estonian, and Hungarian, while Yukaghir is a small family of languages spoken in eastern Siberia. It formerly extended over a much wider area (Collinder 1965:30) and it consists of two surviving languages, Tundra Yukaghir and Kolyma Yukaghir.

Proponents of the Uralo-Siberian proposal include Uralo-Yukaghir as one of its two branches, alongside the Siberian languages (sometimes Nivkh, (formerly) Chukotko-Kamchatkan and Eskimo-Aleut).

== History ==
Similarities between Uralic and Yukaghir were first pointed out by Paasonen (1907) and Lewy (1928), although they did not consider these to be sufficient evidence for a genetic relationship between the two. Holger Pedersen (1931) included Uralic and Yukaghir in his proposed Nostratic language family, and also noted some similarities between them. A genetic relationship between Uralic and Yukaghir was first argued for in detail in 1940, independently by Karl Bouda and Björn Collinder. The hypothesis was further elaborated by Collinder in subsequent publications, and also by other scholars including Harms (1977), Nikolaeva (1988) and Piispanen (2013).

Uralic–Yukaghir is listed as a language family in A Guide to the World's Languages by Merritt Ruhlen (1987), and is accepted as a unit in controversial long-range proposals such as "Eurasiatic" by Joseph Greenberg (2000, 2002) and "Nostratic" by Allan Bomhard (2008), both based on evidence collected by earlier scholars like Collinder.

Uralic-Yukaghir has been criticized by Ante Aikio (Aikio 2014), while it has been recently and heavily advocated by Peter Piispanen and Václav Blažek (Blažek & Piispanen 2024).

== Proposed evidence ==
Collinder based his case for a genetic relationship between Uralic and Yukaghir on lexical and grammatical evidence; the latter included according to him similarities between pronouns, nominal case suffixes, and verb inflection.

The following list of lexical correspondences is taken from Nikolaeva (2006).

Proto-Yukaghir	Proto-Uralic / Proto-Finno-Ugric	Meaning
*čupo-	*ćuppa	'sharp' / 'narrow, thin'
*eme	*emä	'mother'
*iw-	*ime-	'suck'
*köj	*koje	'young man' / 'man'
*leɣ	*sewe-/*seɣe-	'eat'
*mon-	*monV-	'say'
*ńu:	*nime	'name'
*olo-	*sala-	'steal'
*ör-	*or-	'shout'
*pe:	*pije	'mountain, rock' / 'stone'
*pöɣ-	*pukta-	'run, jump'
*qa:r/*qajr	*kore/*ko:re	'skin'
*qol-	*kule-	'hear'
*wonč-	*wacV/*wančV	'root'

The following list of lexical correspondences is taken from Aikio (2019).

Proto-Uralic	Proto-Yukaghir
*aŋi ‘mouth, opening’	*aŋa ‘mouth’
*emä / *ämä	*eme ‘mother’
*̮ila-	*āl- ‘place under or below’
*kälä- ‘wade / rise’	*kile- ‘wade’
*käliw ‘brother- or sister-in-law’	*keľ- ‘brother-in-law’
*kani- ‘go away’	*qon- ‘go’
*koji ‘male, man, husband’	*köj ‘fellow, boy, young man’
*mälki	*mel- ‘breast’
*nimi	*ńim / *nim ‘name’
*ńali-	*ńel- ‘lick’
*pidi- ‘long / high’	*puδe ‘place on or above’, *puδe-nmē- ‘tall, high’
*pi̮ni- ‘put’	*pöń- / *peń- ‘put; leave’
*sala-	*olo- ‘steal’
*sula-	*aľ- ‘melt, thaw’
*wanča(w)	*wonč- ‘root’
*wixi- ‘take, transport’	*weɣ- ‘lead, carry’

The following list of lexical correspondences is taken from Piispanen (2013).

Proto-Uralic	Yukaghir
*ikte 'one'	irke 'one'
*käktä 'two'	kitij 'two'
*ta- 'that'	ta- 'there'
*ki 'who'	kin 'who'
*ku 'which'	qadi 'which'
*me/mon 'I'	mət 'I'
*te/ton 'you'	tət 'you'

== Criticism ==
The Uralic–Yukaghir hypothesis is rejected by many researchers as unsupported. While most agree that there is a core of common vocabulary that cannot be simply dismissed as chance resemblances, it has been argued that these are not the result of common inheritance, but rather due to contact between Yukaghir and Uralic speakers, which resulted in borrowing of vocabulary from Uralic languages (especially Samoyedic) into Yukaghir. Rédei (1999) assembled a large corpus of what he considered as loans from Uralic into Yukaghir. Häkkinen (2012) argues that the grammatical systems show too few convincing resemblances, especially the morphology, and proposes that putative Uralic–Yukaghir cognates are in fact borrowings from an early stage of Uralic (c. 3000 BC; he dates Proto-Uralic to c. 2000 BC) into an early stage of Yukaghir, while Uralic was (according to him) spoken near the Sayan region and Yukaghir near the Upper Lena River and near Lake Baikal. Aikio (2014) agrees with Rédei and Häkkinen that Uralic–Yukaghir is unsupported and implausible, and that common vocabulary shared by the two families is best explained as the result of borrowing from Uralic into Yukaghir, although he rejects many of their (especially Rédei's) examples as spurious or accidental resemblances and puts the date of borrowing much later, arguing that the loanwords he accepts as valid were borrowed from an early stage of Samoyedic (preceding Proto-Samoyedic; thus roughly in the 1st millennium BC) into Yukaghir, in the same general region between the Yenisei River and Lake Baikal.

Proponents of the Uralic–Yukaghir relationship such as Peter S. Piispanen have responded to criticisms by emphasizing that many of the proposed cognates occur in core vocabulary, particularly in function words and high-frequency terms, which are rarely borrowed between languages. He argued that, unlike typical loanword patterns observed in language contact situations (such as in Quechua, where borrowings are heavily concentrated in nouns), the Uralic–Yukaghir correspondences are more evenly distributed across word classes. This includes categories like demonstrative and personal pronouns, numerals, kinship terms, and basic verbs—types of words that are notably resistant to borrowing. Peter S. Piispanen, for example, highlights several of these shared elements: the Yukaghir numeral irke ‘one’ aligns with Proto-Uralic ikte ‘one’; the Proto-Yukaghir first and second person singular pronouns mət ‘I’ and tət ‘you’ correspond to Proto-Uralic mon ‘I’ and *te/ton ‘you’; and the Yukaghir demonstrative root ta- parallels the Proto-Uralic ta-. Piispanen stresses that such wide distribution of apparent cognates across grammatical categories is atypical for loanwords, believing it to support the idea of a genetic relationship rather than simple lexical borrowing.

== Urheimat ==
According to Vladimir Napolskikh, the split between Finno-Ugric and Samoyedic branches might have occurred somewhere in the area between the Ob River and the Irtysh River, following an earlier split between Proto-Uralic and Proto-Yukaghir somewhere in Eastern Siberia.

== See also ==
- Indo-Uralic languages
- Ural–Altaic languages
- Borean languages
- Eskimo-Uralic languages

== Bibliography ==
=== Works cited ===
- Aikio, Ante (2014). "The Uralic–Yukaghir lexical correspondences: genetic inheritance, language contact or chance resemblance?". Finnisch-Ugrische Forschungen [Finno-Ugric research]. 2014 (62): 7–76. doi:10.33339/fuf.86078.
- Bomhard, Allan R. (2008). Reconstructing Proto-Nostratic: Comparative Phonology, Morphology, and Vocabulary. Leiden: Brill.
- Bouda, Karl (1940). "Die finnisch-ugrisch-samojedische Schicht des Jukagirischen". Ungarische Jahrbücher (in German). 20: 80–101.
- Collinder, Björn (1940). Jukagirisch und Uralisch [Yukagirian and Uralic]. Uppsala Universitets Årsskrift 8. Uppsala: Almqvist & Wiksell.
- Collinder, Björn (1957). "Uralo-jukagirische Nachlese". Uppsala Universitets Årsskrift. 12: 105–130.
- Collinder, Björn (1965a). "Hat das Uralische Verwandte? Eine sprachvergleichende Untersuchung". Acta Societatis Linguisticae Upsaliensis. 1: 109–180.
- Collinder, Björn (2021) [First published 1965]. An Introduction to the Uralic Languages. Berkeley and Los Angeles: University of California Press. ISBN 978-052036929-0.
- Greenberg, Joseph H. (2000). Indo-European and Its Closest Relatives: The Eurasiatic Language Family, Volume 1: Grammar. Stanford, California: Stanford University Press. ISBN 978-080473812-5.
- Greenberg, Joseph H. (2002). Indo-European and Its Closest Relatives: The Eurasiatic Language Family, Volume 2: Lexicon. Stanford, California: Stanford University Press. ISBN 978-080474624-3.
- Greenberg, Joseph H. (2005). Croft, William (ed.). Genetic Linguistics: Essays on Theory and Method. Oxford University Press. ISBN 978-019925771-3.
- Häkkinen, Jaakko (2012). "Early contacts between Uralic and Yukaghir". Mémoires de la Société Finno-Ougrienne. 264: 91–101.
- Harms, Robert (1977). Hopper, Paul J. (ed.). Studies in descriptive and historical linguistics. Festschrift for Winfred P. Lehmann. Current Issues in Linguistic Theory. Amsterdam: John Benjamins. pp. 301–316. ISBN 978-902720905-4.
- Lewy, Ernst (1928). "Possessivisch und Passivisch. Bemerkungen zum Verbalausdruck in der sprachlichen Typenlehre" [Possessive and passive. Notes on verbal expression in linguistic type theory]. Ungarische Jahrbücher. 8: 274–289.
- Nikolaeva, Irina (1988). Проблема урало-юкагирских генетических связей [The Problem of Uralo-Yukaghir Genetic Relationship] (PhD dissertation) (in Russian). Moscow: Institute of Linguistics.
- Nikolaeva, Irina (2006). A Historical Dictionary of Yukaghir. Trends in Linguistics. Documentation. Berlin/New York: Mouton de Gruyter. ISBN 978-311018689-5.
- Paasonen, Heikki (1907). "Zur Frage von der Urverwandschaft der finnisch-ugrischen und indoeuropäischen Sprachen" [On the question of the original relationship of the Finnish-Ugric and Indo-European languages]. Finnisch-Ugrische Forschungen. 7: 13–31 – via Internet Archive.
- Pedersen, Holger (1931). Linguistic Science in the Nineteenth Century: Methods and Results. Translated by John Webster Spargo. Cambridge, Massachusetts: Harvard University Press.
- Pedersen, Holger (1933). "Zur Frage nach der Urverwandtschaft des Indoeuropäischen mit dem Ugrofinnischen" [On the question of the original relationship between Indo-European and Ugro-Finnish]. Mémoires de la Société Finno-Ougrienne. 67: 308–325.
- Piispanen, Peter (2013). "The Uralic-Yukaghiric Connection Revisited: Sound Correspondences of Geminate Clusters". Journal de la Société Finno-Ougrienne. 2013 (94): 165–197. doi:10.33340/susa.82515.
- Rédei, Károly (1999). "Zu den uralisch-jukagirischen Sprachkontakten" [On Uralic-Yukagirian language contacts]. Finnisch-Ugrische Forschungen. 55: 1–58.
- Ruhlen, Merritt (1987). A Guide to the World's Languages, Volume 1: Classification. Stanford, California: Stanford University Press. ISBN 978-080471894-3.

=== Further reading ===
- Angere, J. 1956. Die uralo-jukagirische Frage. Ein Beitrag zum Problem der sprachlichen Urverwandschaft. Stockholm: Almqvist & Viksell.
- Bouda, Karl. 1940. "Die finnisch-ugrisch-samojedische Schicht des Jukagirischen." Ungarische Jahrbücher 20, 80–101.
- Fortescue, Michael. 1998. Language Relations Across Bering Strait: Reappraising the Archaeological and Linguistic Evidence. London and New York: Cassell.
- Hyllested, Adam. 2010. "Internal Reconstruction vs. External Comparison: The Case of the Indo-Uralic Laryngeals." Internal Reconstruction in Indo-European, eds. J.E. Rasmussen & T. Olander, 111–136. Copenhagen: Museum Tusculanum Press.
- Janhunen, Juha. 2009. "Proto-Uralic—what, where, and when?" Suomalais-Ugrilaisen Seuran Toimituksia 258. pp. 57–78. Online article.
- Mithen, Steven. 2003. After the Ice: A Global Human History 20,000 – 5000 BC. Orion Publishing Co.
- Nikolaeva, Irina. 1986. "Yukaghir-Altaic parallels" (in Russian). Istoriko-kul'turnye kontakty narodov altajskoj jazykovoj obshchnosti: Tezisy dolkadov XXIX sessii Postojannoj Mezhdunarodnoj Altaisticheskoj Konferencii PIAC, Vol. 2: Lingvistika, pp. 84–86. Tashkent: Akademija Nauk.
- Nikolaeva, Irina. 1987. "On the reconstruction of Proto-Yukaghir: Inlaut consonantism" (in Russian). Jazyk-mif-kul'tura narodov Sibir, 43–48. Jakutsk: JaGU.
- Nikolaeva, Irina. 1988. "On the correspondence of Uralic sibilants and affricates in Yukaghir" (in Russian). Sovetskoe Finnougrovedenie 2, 81–89.
- Rédei, K. 1990. "Zu den uralisch-jukagirischen Sprachkontakten." Congressus septimus internationalis Fenno-Ugristarum. Pars 1 A. Sessiones plenares, 27–36. Debrecen.
- Sauvegeot, Au. 1963. "L'appartenance du youkaguir." Ural-altaische Jahrbücher 35, 109–117.
- Sauvegeot, Au. 1969. "La position du youkaguir." Ural-altaische Jahrbücher 41, 344–359.
- Swadesh, Morris. 1962. "Linguistic relations across the Bering Strait." American Anthropologist 64, 1262–1291.
- Tailleur, O.G. 1959. "Plaidoyer pour le youkaghir, branche orientale de la famille ouralienne." Lingua 6, 403–423.
