= Aurélien Sauvageot =

French linguist

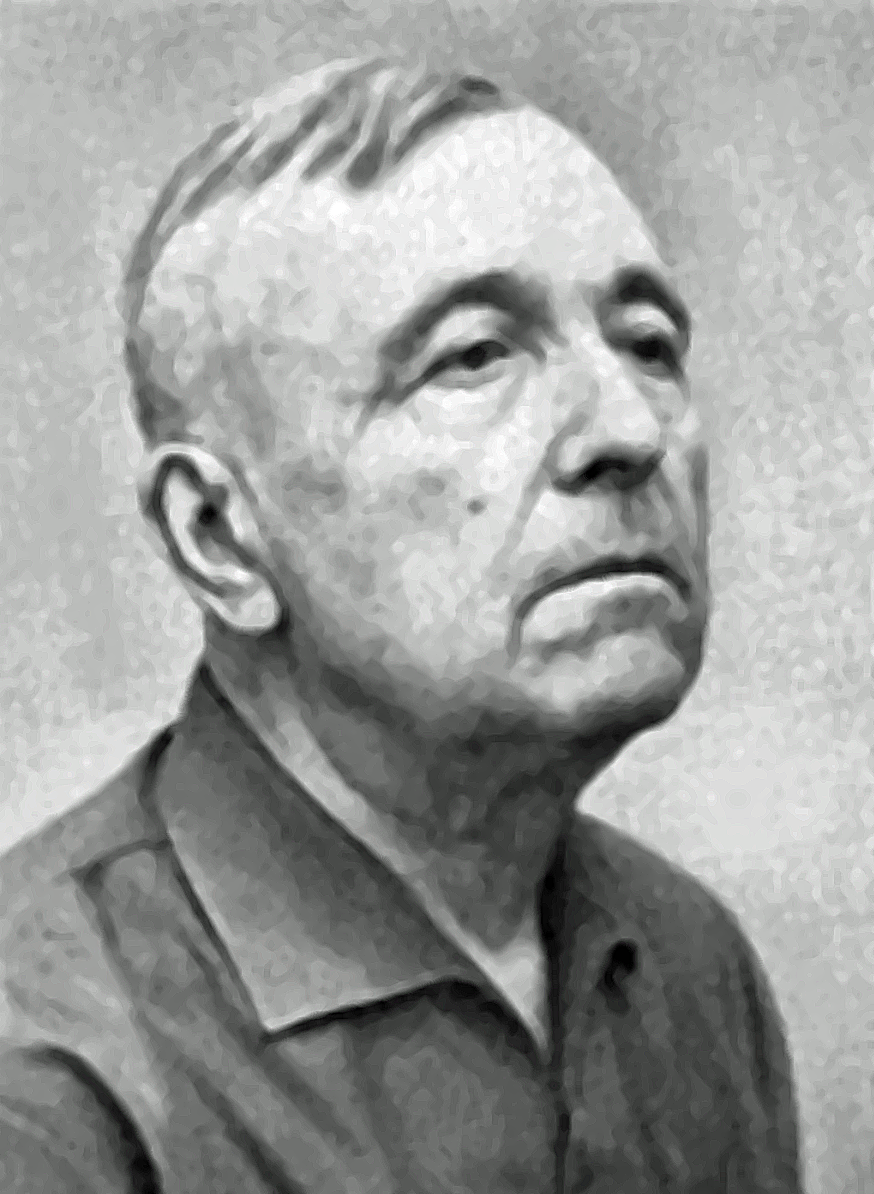
- Born: 13 April 1897; Constantinople
- Died: 5 December 1988 (aged 91); Aix-en-Provence, France

Academic background
- Education: École Normale Supérieure

Academic work
- Discipline: linguistics
- Institutions: Eötvös József Collegium; École française des Langues Orientales
- Main interests: Finno-Ugric languages

Aurélien Sauvageot (1897–1988) was a French linguist. He was specialised in Finno-Ugric languages.

== Biography ==
Sauvageot was born in Constantinople, as his father was an engineer working in the service of the Ottoman Sultan.

In 1918, Sauvageot was admitted at the École Normale Supérieure and started studying Germanic languages. Sauvageot's teachers, most prominent among them Antoine Meillet, pushed him towards Finno-Ugric linguistics as the professorship for it was vacant since philologist Robert Gauthiot had been killed in the First World War. Sauvageot traveled to Uppsala in Sweden where he started learning Finnish, then moved to Finland in June 1919, and stayed there until October.

In 1923, he moved to Hungary to teach French at the Eötvös József Collegium in Budapest. He remained there until 1929, then moved back to France and completed his doctoral thesis on the lexicon of Uralo-Altaic languages, (Note: The Uralo-Altaic family was a hypothesis about a relationship between the Uralic and the Altaic languages. With the latter family discredited, the hypothesis is now obsolete) and a complementary thesis on Gothic articles.

In 1931, Sauvageot inaugurated the professorship for Finno-Ugric languages at the École française des Langues Orientales.

In 1932 and 1937, he published, along with József Balassa and Marcel Benedek the first Hungarian-French and French-Hungarian dictionary.

Although Sauvageot retired in 1967, he remained actively involved in the activities of both the Société de Linguistique de Paris and the Cercle linguistique d'Aix en Provence, until his death in 1988.
