= Bojan Čop =

Slovenian linguist (1923–1994)

- Born: May 23, 1923; Ljubljana, Slovenia
- Died: August 3, 1994 (aged 71); Ljubljana, Slovenia

Academic background
- Education: University of Ljubljana

Academic work
- Discipline: Linguist
- Sub-discipline: Comparative linguistics
- Institutions: University of Ljubljana

Bojan Čop (May 23, 1923 – August 3, 1994) was a Slovenian linguist, best known for his contributions to the ancient languages of Anatolia.

== Life and work ==
Čop was born in Ljubljana. He became an assistant instructor at the University of Ljubljana's Department of Comparative and General Linguistics in 1949. After the retirement of Karel Oštir in 1959, Čop took over responsibility for lectures in comparative Indo-European grammar with an emphasis on modern trends such as the laryngeal theory, Indo-European dialectology, and Indo-European antiquity. In 1966 Čop became the head of the university's Department of Comparative Linguistics and Eastern Studies. After 1970 he also lectured on the Indo-Uralic theory. Čop received his PhD in 1971 from the University of Ljubljana's Faculty of Arts. He was made a full professor in 1972. Čop was made a full member of the Slovenian Academy of Sciences and Arts in 1976. He retired due to illness in 1990 and died in Ljubljana in 1994.

Čop's research initially focused on Indo-European etymology, especially Greek, but he soon turned his attention to the ancient languages of Asia Minor. He authored several studies on grammatical and dialectology issues in Indo-European languages. Čop helped establish new directions in comparative linguistics and made significant contributions to the development of the discipline.

== Legacy ==
Čop's law, which describes the sound change *é.C_{1} > aC_{1}.C_{1} in Luwian, is named after Čop.
