= Michael Fortescue =

British linguist (born 1946)

Michael David Fortescue
- Born: 8 August 1946 (age 80); United Kingdom
- Occupation: Linguist

Michael David Fortescue (born 8 August 1946, Thornbury) is a British-born linguist specializing in Arctic and native North American languages, including Greenlandic, Inuktun, Chukchi and Nitinaht.

Fortescue is renowned for his reconstructions of the Eskaleut, Chukotko-Kamchatkan, Nivkh, and Wakashan proto-languages.

== Biography ==
As a young teenager, Fortescue and his family moved to California where he went to La Jolla High School, graduating in 1959. He finished school at Abingdon School in 1963. In 1966, he received a B.A. with "Honours with great Distinction" in Slavic languages and literatures from University of California, Berkeley, where he then taught Russian from 1968 to 1970 and finished an M.A. in Slavic languages and literatures. In the years from 1971 to 1975 he taught English for the International Language Centre in Osaka and the University of Aix/Marseille. He took a PhD in Linguistics at the University of Edinburgh from 1975 to 1978 with the thesis Procedural discourse generation model for 'Twenty Questions'. With a Danish scholarship, he visited University of Copenhagen and did fieldwork in Greenland in from 1978 to 1979, and this research became supported from the Danish Research Council for the Humanities in the period from 1979 to 1982. In 1984, he became associate professor in eskimology at the University of Copenhagen, and in 1989 docent. He became professor in linguistics in 1999, and retired in 2011.

On the occasion of his retirement in 2011, a special issue in the journal Grønland was published in 2012 as a festschrift. After retiring, he moved to England, where he was elected an associate of St Hugh's College. An edited book was published as a festschrift in his honour in 2017. In 2019, he was elected to Academia Europaea.

He was the chairman of the Linguistic Circle of Copenhagen from 2005 to 2011.

== Uralo-Siberian languages ==
Uralo-Siberian
- (Neither widely accepted nor widely rejected)
- Geographic distribution: Northern Eurasia, the Arctic
- Linguistic classification: Proposed language family
- Subdivisions: Uralic; Yukaghir; Eskaleut; Chukotko-Kamchatkan (sometimes included); Nivkh (sometimes included)

Language codes
- Glottolog: None
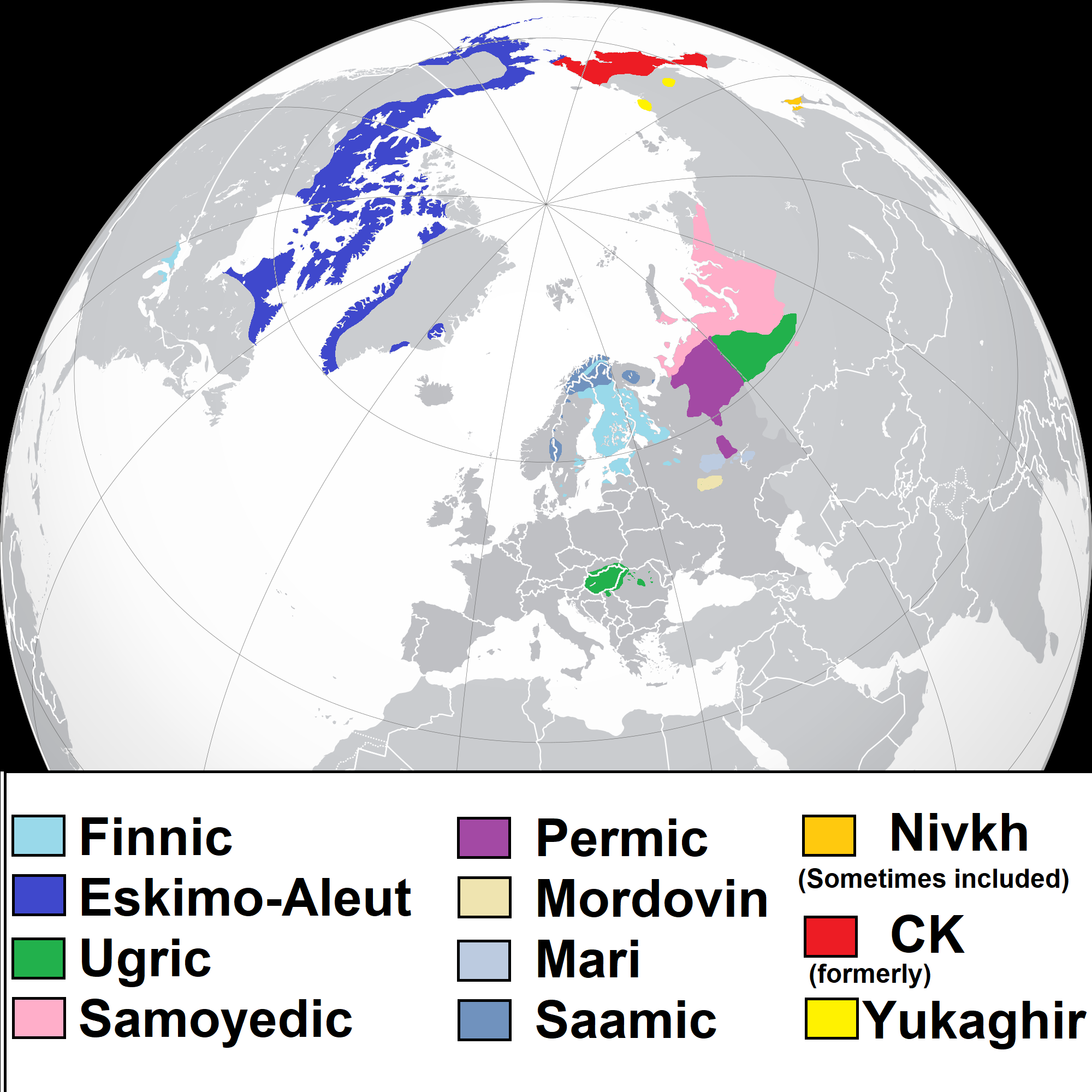

Uralo-Siberian is a hypothetical language family consisting of Uralic, Yukaghir, and Eskaleut. It was proposed in 1998 by Michael Fortescue in his book Language Relations across Bering Strait. Some have attempted to include Nivkh in Uralo-Siberian. Until 2011, it also included Chukotko-Kamchatkan. However, after 2011 Fortescue only included Uralic, Yukaghir and Eskaleut in the theory, although he argued that Uralo-Siberian languages have influenced Chukotko-Kamchatkan.

Connections with the Uralic and other language families are generally seen as speculative, including Fortescue's Uralo-Siberian hypothesis. Fortescue's observations have been evaluated by specialists with a limited degree of positivity but are viewed as scattered evidence and still remain highly speculative and unproven and the soundness of the reconstructed common ancestors are challenging to evaluate.

=== History ===
Structural similarities between Uralic and Eskaleut languages were observed early. In 1746, the Danish theologian Marcus Wøldike compared Greenlandic to Hungarian. In 1818, Rasmus Rask considered Greenlandic to be related to the Uralic languages, Finnish in particular, and presented a list of lexical correspondences (Rask also considered Uralic and Altaic to be related to each other). In 1959, Knut Bergsland published the paper The Eskimo–Uralic Hypothesis, in which he, like other authors before him, presented a number of grammatical similarities and a small number of lexical correspondences. In 1962, Morris Swadesh proposed a relationship between the Eskaleut and Chukotko-Kamchatkan language families. In 1998, Michael Fortescue presented more detailed arguments in his book, Language Relations across Bering Strait. His title evokes Morris Swadesh's 1962 article, "Linguistic relations across the Bering Strait".

=== Typology ===
Fortescue (1998, pp. 60–95) surveys 44 typological markers and argues that a typological profile uniquely identifying the language families proposed to comprise the Uralo-Siberian family can be established. The Uralo-Siberian hypothesis is rooted in the assumption that this distinct typological profile was, rather than an areal profile common to four unrelated language families, the profile of a single language ancestral to all four: Proto-Uralo-Siberian.

Phonology

- A single, voiceless series of stop consonants.
  - Voiced stops such as /d/ occur in the Indo-European, Yeniseian, Turkic, Mongolian, Tungusic, Japonic and Sino-Tibetan languages. They have also later arisen in several branches of Uralic.
  - Aspirated stops such as /tʰ/ occur in Korean, Nivkh, Na-Dene, Haida, etc.
  - Ejective stops such as /tʼ/ occur in Na-Dene, Haida, Salishan, Tsimshian, etc.
- A series of voiced non-sibilant fricatives, including /ð/, which lack voiceless counterparts such as /θ/.
  - Original non-sibilant fricatives are absent from most other languages of Eurasia. Voiceless fricatives prevail over voiced ones in most of northern America. Both voiced and voiceless fricatives occur in Nivkh.
- Primary palatal or palatalized consonants such as /ɲ ~ nʲ/, /ʎ ~ lʲ/.
- The occurrence of a rhotic consonant /r/.
  - Found in most other language families of northern Eurasia as well; however, widely absent from languages of northern America.
- Consonant clusters are absent word-initially and word-finally, but present word-medially.
  - A feature shared with most 'Altaic' languages. Contrasts with the presence of abundant consonant clusters in Nivkh, as well as in the Indo-European and Salishan languages.
- Canonically bisyllabic word roots, with the exception of pronouns.
  - Contrasts with canonically monosyllabic word roots in Indo-European, Sino-Tibetan, Yeniseian, Na-Dene, Haida, Tsimshian, Wakashan, Salishan, etc. Some secondarily monosyllabic word roots have developed in Aleut and multiple Uralic languages, and they predominate in Itelmen.
- Word-initial stress.

Morphology

- Exclusively suffixal morphology.
  - Contrasts particularly with Yeniseian and Na-Dene.
- Accusative case, genitive case and at least three locative cases.
- Singular, plural and dual number.
- The absence of adjectives and adverbs as morphologically distinct parts of speech.
- Evidentiality marking.
- Indicative markers based on participles.
- Possessive suffixes.

Syntax

- The presence of a copula, used as an auxiliary verb.
- Negation expressed by an auxiliary verb (known as a negative verb)
- Subordinate clauses based on non-finite verb forms.

None of the four families shows all of these 17 features; ranging from 12 reconstructible in Proto-Chukotko-Kamchatkan to 16 in Proto-Uralic. Frequently the modern-day descendant languages have diverged further from this profile — particularly Itelmen, for which Fortescue assumes substrate influence from a language typologically more alike to the non-Uralo-Siberian languages of the region.

Several more widely spread typologically significant features may also instead represent contact influence, according to Fortescue (1998):

- Primary uvular consonants are absent from Uralic, but can be found in Chukotko-Kamchatkan and Eskaleut. They are also present in Yukaghir, though are likely to be of secondary origin there (as also in the Uralic Selkup, as well as a large number of Turkic languages). They are, however, firmly entrenched in the non-Uralo-Siberian languages of northernmost Eurasia, including Yeniseian, Nivkh, Na-Dene, Haida, Salishan, etc. Fortescue suggests that the presence of uvulars in CK and EA may, then, represent an ancient areal innovation acquired from the earlier, "pre-Na-Dene" languages of Beringia.

=== Evidence ===
==== Morphology ====
Apparently shared elements of Uralo-Siberian morphology include the following:

*-t	plural
*-k	dual
*m-	1st person
*t-	2nd person
*ka	interrogative pronoun
*-n	genitive case

==== Lexicon ====
Fortescue (1998) lists 94 lexical correspondence sets with reflexes in at least three of the four language families, and even more shared by two of the language families. Examples are *ap(p)a 'grandfather', *kað'a 'mountain' and many others.

Below are some lexical items reconstructed to Proto-Uralo-Siberian, along with their reflexes in Proto-Uralic, Proto-Chukotko-Kamchatkan (sometimes Proto-Chukchi), Proto-Yukaghir and Proto-Eskaleut (sometimes Proto-Eskimo or Aleut). (Source: Fortescue 1998:152–158.)

Proto-Uralo-Siberian	Proto-Uralic	Proto-Chukotko-Kamchatkan	Proto-Yukaghir	Proto-Eskaleut
*aj(aɣ)- 'push forward'	*aja- 'drive, chase'	*aj-tat- 'chase, herd' (PC)	*ej- 'drive in, dash'	*ajaɣ- 'push, thrust at with pole'
*ap(p)a 'grandfather'	*appe 'father in law'	*æpæ 'grandfather'	*awa 'elder'	*ap(p)a 'grandfather'
*el(l)ä 'not'	*elä 'not'	*ællæ 'not' (PC)	*əl 'negative marker'	*-la(ɣ)- 'not' (A)
*pit(uɣ)- 'tie up'	*pitV- 'tie' (FU)	*pət- 'tie up'	*pant- 'tie together, trap'	*pətuɣ- 'tie up'
*toɣə- 'take'	*toɣe- 'bring, take, give' (FU)	*teɣiŋrə- 'pull out'	*teː- 'give, show'	*teɣu- 'take' (PE)

Proposed cognates between the languages:

Proto-Yukagir	Proto-Eskaleut
*al 'below'	*atə 'below'
*amlə 'swallow'	*ama 'suckle'
*aŋa 'mouth'	*aŋ-va- 'open'
*cowinə 'spear'	*caviɣ 'knife'
*kin 'who'	*kina 'who'
*ləɣ- 'eat'	*iɣa- 'swallow'
*um 'close'	*uməɣ 'close'
*n’ə 'get'	*nəɣ 'get'
*ta 'that'	*ta 'that'

Uralic	Eskaleut
*ila 'under'	*at(ǝ) 'down'
*elä 'live'	*ǝt(ǝ) 'be'
*tuli 'come'	*tut 'arrive, land'
*ke 'who'	*kina 'who'
*to 'that'	*ta 'that'
*kuda 'morning, dawn'	*qilaɣ 'sky'
*kuda 'weave'	*qilaɣ 'weave'

According to Ante Aikio (who does not believe that Yukaghir is related to Uralic), the words glossed 'weave' and 'morning' in the last two rows, despite being homonyms in each language, are most likely unrelated. Such instances of coincidental homonymy between languages, which only very rarely happens by chance, suggest that some kind of contact most likely happened, but exact conclusions cannot be drawn with modern information.

==== Grammatical ====
Fortescue suggested the following grammatical similarities to point to a relationship:

Proto-Uralic and Proto-Eskaleut number and case markers:

	Proto-Uralic	Proto-Eskaleut
nom./absolutive sing.	Ø	Ø
dual	*-kə	*k
plural	*-t	*-t
locative	*-(kə)na	*-ni
accusative sing	*-m	–
plural accusative	*-j/i	*-(ŋ)i
ablative	*-(kə)tə	*-kənc
dative/lative	*-kə/-ŋ	*-ŋun

==== Yukaghir and Proto-Eskaleut verbal and nominal inflections ====
Yukaghir and Proto-Eskaleut verbal and nominal inflections:

Pronoun	Yukaghir	Eskaleut
trans. 1s	*ŋ	*ŋa
3pl	*ŋi	*ŋi
3 poss.	*ntə	*n
vialis	*-(n)kən	*-(n)kən
abl.	*-(n)kət	*(m/n)əɣ
all	*(ŋi)n’	*-(m/n)un / *ŋus/*-ŋun
adv. loc./lative	*nə	*nə

=== Relationships ===
Some or all of the four Uralo-Siberian families have been included in more extensive groupings of languages (see links below). Fortescue's hypothesis does not oppose or exclude these various proposals. In particular, he considers that a remote relationship between Uralo-Siberian and Altaic (or some part of Altaic) is likely (see Ural–Altaic languages). However, Fortescue holds that Uralo-Siberian lies within the bounds of the provable, whereas Nostratic may be too remote a grouping to ever be convincingly demonstrated.

The University of Leiden linguist Frederik Kortlandt (2006:1) asserts that Indo-Uralic (a proposed language family consisting of Uralic and Indo-European) is itself a branch of Uralo-Siberian and that, furthermore, the Nivkh language also belongs to Uralo-Siberian. This would make Uralo-Siberian the proto-language of a much vaster language family. Kortlandt (2006:3) considers that Uralo-Siberian and Altaic (defined by him as consisting of Turkic, Mongolian, Tungusic, Korean, and Japanese) may be coordinate branches of the Eurasiatic language family proposed by Joseph Greenberg but rejected by most linguists.

== Selected works ==
Fortescue's Comparative Eskimo Dictionary, co-authored with Steven Jacobson and Lawrence Kaplan, is the standard work in its area, as is his Comparative Chukotko-Kamchatkan Dictionary. In his book Pattern and Process, Fortescue explores the possibilities of a linguistic theory based on the philosophical theories of Alfred North Whitehead.

A more complete listing is available in the Festschrift in his honor.

- 1984. Some Problems Concerning the Correlation and Reconstruction of Eskimo and Aleut Mood Markers. Institut for Eskimologi, Københavns Universitet.
- 1990. From the Writings of the Greenlanders: Kalaallit Atuakklaannit. University of Alaska Press. ISBN 9780912006437
- 1991. Inuktun: An Introduction to the Language of Qaanaaq, Thule. Institut for eskimologis skriftrække, Københavns Universitet. ISBN 9788787874168
- 1992. Editor. Layered Structure and Reference in a Functional Perspective. John Benjamins Publishing Co. ISBN 9789027250353
- 1994. With Steven Jacobson and Lawrence Kaplan. Comparative Eskimo Dictionary with Aleut Cognates. Alaska Native Language Center. ISBN 9781555000516
- 1998. Language Relations across Bering Strait: Reappraising the Archaeological and Linguistic Evidence. London and New York: Cassell. ISBN 9780304703302
- 2001. Pattern and Process: A Whiteheadian Perspective on Linguistics. John Benjamins Publishing Co. ISBN 9781588110589
- 2002. The Domain of Language. Copenhagen: Museum Tusculanum Press. ISBN 9788772897066
- 2005. Comparative Chukotko-Kamchatkan Dictionary. Berlin: Walter de Gruyter. ISBN 9783110184174
- 2007. Comparative Wakashan Dictionary. Munich: LINCOM Europa. ISBN 9783895867248
- 2009. A Neural Network Model of Lexical Organisation (Continuum) ISBN 9781441111432
- 2016. Comparative Nivkh Dictionary. Munich: LINCOM Europa GmBH. ISBN 9783862886876
- 2022. Mid-Holocene Language Connections between Asia and North America (Brill) ISBN 9789004436817
- 2025. Inuktun: An introduction to the language of Qaanaaq, Thule (LINCOM GmbH) ISBN 9783969392454

== See also ==
- Proto-Chukotko-Kamchatkan language
- Proto-Eskaleut language
- List of Old Abingdonians
- Haplogroup N-M231
- Proto-Chukotko-Kamchatkan language
- Proto-Uralic language
- Classification of indigenous languages of the Americas
- Linguistic areas of the Americas
- The Last of the Vostiaks

=== Related language family proposals ===
- Eskimo–Uralic languages
- Eurasiatic languages
- Indo-Uralic languages
- Nostratic languages
- Ural–Altaic languages
- Uralic–Yukaghir languages
- Chukotko-Kamchatkan–Amuric languages
- Sino-Uralic languages
