= Indo-Uralic hypothesis =

Hypothetical language family consisting of Indo-European and Uralic

Indo-Uralic
- (Proposed language family)
- Geographic distribution: Eurasia
- Linguistic classification: hypothetical
- Subdivisions: Indo-European; Uralic/Uralic–Yukaghir/Uralo-Siberian (Kortlandt)

Language codes
- Glottolog: None
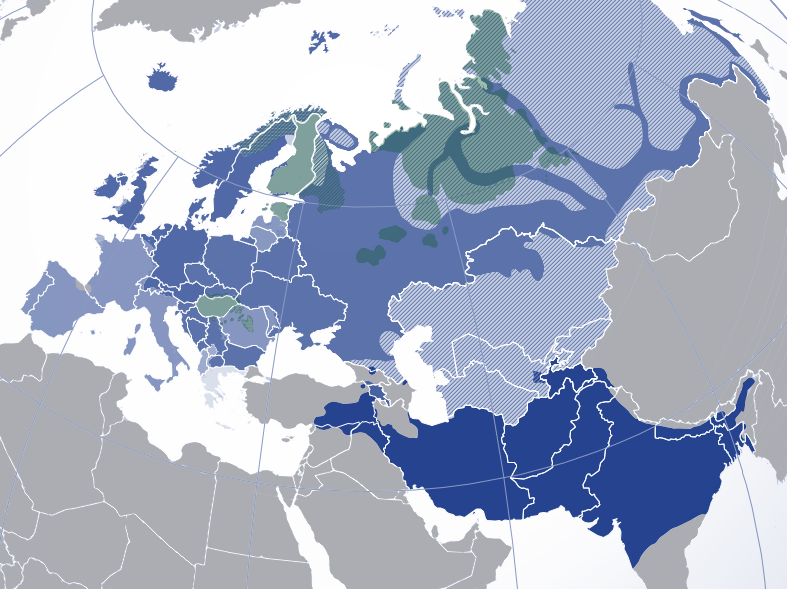

Indo-Uralic is a hypothetical language family including the Indo-European and Uralic families.

The suggestion of a genetic relationship between Indo-European and Uralic is often credited to the Danish linguist Vilhelm Thomsen in 1869, though an earlier version was proposed by Finnish linguist Daniel Europaeus in 1853 and 1863. Neither has gained significant support. Since then, the predominant opinion in the linguistic community has remained that the evidence for such a relationship is insufficient to confirm a genetic relationship versus similarity due to language contact. Some linguists have always taken the contrary view e.g. Henry Sweet, Holger Pedersen, Björn Collinder, Warren Cowgill, Jochem Schindler, Eugene Helimski, Frederik Kortlandt and Alwin Kloekhorst.

The Indo-Uralic hypothesis has been evaluated by recent linguistic data, contradicting previous argued cognates, not finding a genealogical relationship between Uralic and Indo-European.

== Geography of the proposed Indo-Uralic family ==
The Dutch linguist Frederik Kortlandt supports a model of Indo-Uralic in which the original Indo-Uralic speakers lived north of the Caspian Sea, and the Proto-Indo-European speakers began as a group that branched off westward from there to come into geographic proximity with the Northwest Caucasian languages, absorbing a Northwest Caucasian lexical blending before moving farther westward to a region north of the Black Sea where their language settled into canonical Proto-Indo-European. Allan Bomhard suggests a similar schema in Indo-European and the Nostratic Hypothesis Alternatively, it has been proposed that the common protolanguage may have been located north of the Black Sea, with Proto-Uralic moving northwards with the climatic improvement of post-glacial times.

== History of the Indo-Uralic hypothesis ==
A history of early Indo-Uralic studies can be found in Holger Pedersen's Linguistic Science in the Nineteenth Century. Vilhelm Thomsen first raised the possibility of a connection between Indo-European and Finno-Ugric in 1869, "he did not pursue the subject very far". The next important statement in this area was that of Nikolai Anderson in 1879. Pedersen said the value of Anderson’s work was "impaired by its many errors". The English phonetician Henry Sweet argued for kinship between Indo-European and Finno-Ugric in his semi-popular book The History of Language in 1900. Sweet's treatment awakened "[g]reat interest" in the question, but "his space was too limited to permit of actual proof". A somewhat longer study by K. B. Wiklund appeared in 1906 and another by Heikki Paasonen in 1908 (i.e. 1907). Pedersen considered that these two studies sufficed to settle the question and that, after them, "it seems unnecessary to doubt the relationship further".

Sweet considered the relationship to be securely established, stating ("Aryan" = Indo-European, "Ugrian" = Finno-Ugric):

If all these and many other resemblances that might be adduced do not prove the common origin of Aryan and Ugrian, and if we assume that the Ugrians borrowed not only a great part of their vocabulary, but also many of their derivative syllables, together with at least the personal endings of their verbs from Aryan, then the whole fabric of comparative philology falls to the ground, and we are no longer justified in inferring from the similarity of the inflections in Greek, Latin, and Sanskrit that these languages have a common origin.

The short name "Indo-Uralic" (German Indo-Uralisch) for the hypothesis was first introduced by Hannes Sköld 1927.

Björn Collinder, author of the Comparative Grammar of the Uralic Languages (1960), a standard work in the field of Uralic studies, argued for the kinship of Uralic and Indo-European (1934, 1954, 1965).

Alwin Kloekhorst, author of the Etymological Dictionary of the Hittite Inherited Lexicon, endorses the Indo-Uralic grouping. He argues that, when features differ between the Anatolian languages (including Hittite) and the other Indo-European languages, comparisons with Uralic can help to establish which group has the more archaic forms and that, conversely, the success of such comparisons helps to establish the Indo-Uralic thesis For example, in Anatolian the nominative singular of the second person pronoun comes from *ti(H), whereas in the non-Anatolian languages it comes from *tu(H); in Proto-Uralic it was *ti, which agrees with evidence from internal reconstruction that Anatolian has the more archaic form.

The most extensive attempt to establish sound correspondences between Indo-European and Uralic to date is that of the Slovenian linguist Bojan Čop. It was published as a series of articles in various academic journals from 1970 to 1989 under the collective title Indouralica. The topics to be covered by each article were sketched out at the beginning of "Indouralica II". Of the projected 18 articles, 11 appeared. These articles have not been collected into a single volume and thereby remain difficult to access.

In the 1980s, Russian linguist Nikolai Dmitrievich Andreev proposed a "Borean languages" hypothesis linking the Indo-European, Uralic, and Altaic (including Korean in his later papers) language families. Andreev also proposed 203 lexical roots for his hypothesized Boreal macrofamily. After Andreev's death in 1997, the Boreal hypothesis was further expanded by Sorin Paliga.

=== Sound correspondences ===
Some sound correspondences between Proto-Indo-European and Proto-Uralic that Čop asserted are:

- Uralic *m *n *l *r = Indo-European *m *n *l *r.
- Uralic *j *w = Indo-European *i̯ *u̯.
- Uralic sibilants (presumably *s š ś) = Indo-European *s.
- Uralic word-initial voiceless stops (presumably *p t č ć k) = Indo-European word-initial voiced aspirates (presumably *bʰ *dʰ *ǵʰ *gʰ *gʷʰ) and voiceless stops (presumably *p *t *ḱ *k *kʷ), also Indo-European *s followed by one of these stops.
- Uralic *ŋ = Indo-European *g and *ng.

== History of opposition to the Indo-Uralic hypothesis ==
The history of early opposition to the Indo-Uralic hypothesis does not appear to have been written. It is clear from the statements of supporters such as Sweet that they were facing considerable opposition and that the general climate of opinion was against them, except perhaps in Scandinavia.

Károly Rédei, editor of the etymological dictionary of the Uralic languages, rejected the idea of a genetic relationship between Uralic and Indo-European, arguing that the lexical items shared by Uralic and Indo-European were due to borrowing from Indo-European into Proto-Uralic.

Perhaps the best-known critique of recent times is that of Jorma Koivulehto. Koivulehto's central contention, agreeing with Rédei's views, is that all of the lexical items claimed to be Indo-Uralic can be explained as loans from Indo-European into Uralic (see below for examples).

The linguists Christian Carpelan, Asko Parpola and Petteri Koskikallio suggest that early Indo-European and Uralic stand in early contact and suggest that any similarities between them are explained through early language contact and borrowings.

In 2022, a group of scholars concluded that Proto-Uralic and Proto-Indo-European do not share a genealogical relationship with each other, as "whether based on cognacy or loans the argument from lexical resemblances is flawed". According to them, "Uralic is distinctive in western Eurasia. A number of typological properties are eastern-looking overall, fitting comfortably into northeast Asia, Siberia, or the North Pacific Rim". Previously proposed cognates can be largely explained via borrowings from Indo-Iranian languages. They concluded in regards to the Indo-Uralic hypothesis that "of what we take to be the two statistically soundest recent quantitative tests, Kessler and Lehtonen (2006), using a 100-item Swadesh-like wordlist, found no evidence for Indo-Uralic".

== Linguistic similarities ==
=== Morphological ===
The most common arguments in favour of a relationship between Indo-European and Uralic are based on seemingly common elements of morphology, such as the pronominal roots (*m- for first person; *t- for second person), case markings (accusative *-m; ablative *-ta), interrogative/relative pronouns (*kʷ- "who?, which?"; *y- "who, which" to signal relative clauses). Other, less obvious correspondences are suggested, such as the Indo-European plural marker *-es (or *-s in the accusative plural *-m̥-s) and its Uralic counterpart *-t. This same word-final assibilation of *-t to *-s may also be present in Indo-European second-person singular *-s in comparison with Uralic second-person singular *-t. Compare, within Indo-European itself, *-s second-person singular injunctive, *-si second-person singular present indicative, *-tHa second-person singular perfect, *-te second-person plural present indicative, *tu "you" (singular) nominative, *tei "to you" (singular) enclitic pronoun. These forms suggest that the underlying second-person marker in Indo-European may be *t and that the *u found in forms such as *tu was originally an affixal particle or merely analogical. An Indo-European marginal locative *-en compares in function the most closely with the Uralic locative *-na, in form with the Uralic genitive *-n, which has inspired suggestions of a single Indo-Uralic *n-case with later development into multiple case forms in both families.

Similarities have long been noted between the verb conjugation systems of Uralic languages and Indo-European languages. Although it would not be uncommon for a language to borrow heavily from the vocabulary of another language (as in the cases of English from French, Persian from Arabic, and Korean from Chinese), it would be extremely unusual for a language to borrow its basic system of verb conjugation from another. However, the strongly divergent sound systems of Proto-Indo-European and Proto-Uralic are an aggravating factor both in the morphological and the lexical realm, making it additionally difficult to judge resemblances and interpret them as either borrowings, possible cognates or chance resemblances.

=== Lexical ===
A second type of evidence advanced in favor of an Indo-Uralic family is lexical. A small number of words reconstructable to Proto-Indo-European and Proto-Uralic resemble each other (see list below). The problem is to distinguish between cognates and borrowings. Uralic languages have been in contact with a succession of Indo-European languages for millennia. As a result, many words have been borrowed between them, most often from Indo-European languages into Uralic ones.

An example of a Uralic word that cannot be original is Finno-Ugric *śata "hundred". The Proto-Indo-European form of this word was *ḱm̥tóm (compare Latin centum), which became *ćatám in early Indo-Iranian (reanalyzed as the neuter nominative–accusative singular of an a stem > Sanskrit śatá-, Avestan sata-). This is evidence that the word was borrowed into Finno-Ugric from Indo-Iranian or Indo-Aryan. This borrowing may have occurred in the region north of the Pontic–Caspian steppes around 2100–1800 BC, the approximate floruit of Indo-Iranian. It provides linguistic evidence for the geographical location of these languages around that time, agreeing with archeological evidence that Indo-European speakers were present in the Pontic-Caspian steppes by around 4500 BCE (the Kurgan hypothesis) and that Uralic speakers may have been established in the Pit-Comb Ware culture to their north in the fifth millennium BCE.

Another ancient borrowing is Finno-Permic *porćas "piglet". This word corresponds closely in form to the Proto-Indo-European word reconstructed as *porḱos, attested by such forms as Latin porcus "hog", Old English fearh (> English farrow "young pig"), Lithuanian par̃šas "piglet, castrated boar", and Saka pāsa (< *pārsa) "pig". In the Indo-European word, *-os (> Finno-Ugric *-as) is a masculine nominative singular ending, but it is quite meaningless in Uralic languages. This shows that the whole word was borrowed as a unit and is not part of the original Uralic vocabulary.

Thus, *śata cannot be Indo-Uralic on account of its phonology, while *porćas cannot be Indo-Uralic on account of its morphology.

Such words as those for "hundred", "pig" have something in common: they represent "cultural vocabulary" as opposed to "basic vocabulary". They are likely to have been acquired along with a novel number system and the domestic pig from Indo-Europeans in the south. Similarly, the Indo-Europeans themselves had acquired such words and cultural items from peoples to their south or west, including possibly their words for "ox", *gʷou- (compare English cow) and "grain", *bʰars- (compare English barley). In contrast, basic vocabulary – words such as "me", "hand", "water", and "be" – is much less readily borrowed between languages. If Indo-European and Uralic are genetically related, there should be agreements regarding basic vocabulary, with more agreements if they are closely related, fewer if they are less closely related.

Advocates of a genetic relation between Indo-European and Uralic maintain that the borrowings can be filtered out by application of phonological and morphological analysis and that a core of vocabulary common to Indo-European and Uralic remains. As examples they advance such comparisons as Proto-Uralic *weti : Proto-Indo-European *wodr̥, oblique stem *wedn-, both meaning 'water', and Proto-Uralic *nimi- : Proto-Indo-European *h₁nōmn̥, both meaning 'name'.

==== Objections to this interpretation ====
It has been countered that nothing prevents this common vocabulary from having been borrowed from Proto-Indo-European into Proto-Uralic.

For the old loans, it is more the rule than the exception that only the stem is borrowed, without any case-endings. Proto-Uralic *nimi- has been explained according to sound laws governing substitutions in borrowings, on the assumption that the original was a zero-grade oblique stem PIE *(H)nmen- as attested in later Balto-Slavic *inmen- and Proto-Celtic *anmen-. Proto-Uralic *weti- could be a loan from the PIE oblique e-grade form for 'water' or from an indirectly attested cognate root noun *wed-. Proto-Uralic *toxi- 'give' and PFU *wetä- 'lead' also make perfect phonologic sense as borrowings.

The number systems of Indo-European and Uralic show no commonalities. Moreover, while the numbers in all Indo-European languages can be traced back to reconstructed Proto-Indo-European numbers, this cannot be done for the Uralic numbers, where only "two" and "five" are common to all of the family (roots for 3-6 are common to all subgroups other than Samoyedic, and slightly less widespread roots are known for numerals other than 8 and 9). This would appear to show that if Proto-Indo-European and Proto-Uralic are to be related, the connection must lie so far back that the families developed their number systems independently and did not inherit them from their purported common ancestor. Although, the fact that Uralic languages themselves do not share the same numbers across all Uralic branches indicates that they would not with Indo-European languages in any case, even if they were in fact related.

It is also objected that some or all of the common vocabulary items claimed are false cognates – words whose resemblance is merely coincidental, like English bad and Persian بد (bad).

== Some possible cognates ==
Meaning	Proto-Indo-European	Indo-European examples	Proto-Uralic	Uralic examples	References
first person singular verbal suffix	*-m	Sanskrit -m, Old Persian -m, Latin -m, Oscan -m.	*-m	Finnish -n (-n < -m), Erzya -m, Moksha -n, Mari -m, Mansi -m, Udmurt -m; Nenets -m, Tavgi -m.	Kortlandt (2008b)
second person singular verbal suffix	*-s (active)	Sanskrit -s, Greek -s, Latin -s, Gothic -s, Hittite -s.	*-t	Finnish -t, Erzya & Moksha -t, Mari -t.	Kortlandt (2008b)
second person singular verbal suffix	*-tHa (perfect)	Greek -tʰa, Sanskrit -tʰa.	*-t	Finnish -t, Erzya & Moksha -t, Mari -t.	Kortlandt (2008b)
accusative	*-m	Sanskrit -m, Old Persian -m, Latin -m, Oscan -m.	*-m	Finnish -n (-n < -m), Mari -m, Mansi -m; Nenets -m, Kamassian -m	Paasonen (1907), Kortlandt (2008b)
ablative	*-od	Sanskrit tasmād 'from this', Old Latin meritōd 'deservedly'.	*-ta ~ *-tä	Finnish -ta ~ -tä, Veps -d, Moksha -da ~ -ta.	Paasonen (1907), Kortlandt (2008b)
nominative–accusative plural	*-es (nominative plural)	Greek -es, Sanskrit -as.	*-t	Finnish -t, Erzya & Moksha -t, Udmurt -t; Selkup -t.	Kortlandt (2008b)
nominative–accusative plural	*-n̥s (accusative plural) < *-m̥ (acc.sg.) + *-(e)s (pl.)	Greek trí-ns, Gothic sunu-ns.	*-t	Finnish -t, Erzya & Moksha -t, Udmurt -t; Selkup -t.	Kortlandt (2008b)
oblique plural	*-i (pronominal plural, as in *we-i- 'we' *to-i- 'those')	Gothic wei-s, Sanskrit vay-ám; Greek toí, Avestan tōi.	*-j	Saami -i, Finnish -i; Hungarian -i- (e.g. hajó 'ship', hajó-m 'my ship', hajó-i-m 'my ships').	Kortlandt (2008b)
dual	*-H₁	A lost consonant has lengthened the final vowel, as in Sanskrit tā́ nominative–accusative dual versus tá-m accusative singular.	*-k(V)	Mansi -γ, Selkup -qy.	
'and' (postposed conjunction)	*-kʷe	Latin -que, Greek te, Sanskrit -ca, etc.	*-ka ~ *-kä	Finnish -kä in ei ... eikä 'neither ... nor', Saami -ge, Moksha -ka, Votyak -ke, Komi / Zyrian -kȯ, etc.	
negative particle 'not'	*ne	Latin ne-, Greek ne-, Sanskrit ná, Old High German and Old English ne ~ ni, etc.	? *ni	Hungarian ne/nem, Mari nõ-, ni-, Votyak / Udmurt ni-, etc.	Paasonen (1907), Kortlandt (2008b)
'I, me'	*me 'me' (accusative)	Greek me (enclitic).	*minä / *mun 'I'	Finnish minä, Estonian mina, Erzya & Moksha mon; Nenets məny°.	Paasonen (1907)
'I, me'	*mene 'my' (genitive)	Old Persian mana, Old Church Slavic mene, Welsh men, etc.	*minä / *mun 'I'	Finnish minä, Estonian mina, Erzya & Moksha mon; Nenets məny°.	Paasonen (1907)
'you' (singular)	*tu (nominative)	Latin tū, Greek sú (Attic), tu (Dorian), Lithuanian tù, Old English þu > archaic English thou, etc.	*tinä / *tun	Finnish sinä (< *tinä), Saami ton, tú-, Erzya & Moksha ton, Votyak ton, Zyrian te, accusative tenõ, Hungarian te 'you' (singular), ti 'you' (plural), etc. Samoyed: Tavgi tannaŋ, Yeniseian Samoyed tod'i, Selkup tan, tat, Kamassian tan.	Paasonen (1907)
'you' (singular)	*twe (accusative)	Greek sé, Sanskrit tvā (enclitic), Avestan θwā (enclitic), Old Church Slavic tebe, etc.	*tinä / *tun	Finnish sinä (< *tinä), Saami ton, tú-, Erzya & Moksha ton, Votyak ton, Zyrian te, accusative tenõ, Hungarian te 'you' (singular), ti 'you' (plural), etc. Samoyed: Tavgi tannaŋ, Yeniseian Samoyed tod'i, Selkup tan, tat, Kamassian tan.	Paasonen (1907)
'you' (singular)	*tewe 'your' (genitive)	Sanskrit táva, Avestan tava, Proto-Celtic *towe (< PIE *tewe, with complex developments in the individual languages.	*tinä / *tun	Finnish sinä (< *tinä), Saami ton, tú-, Erzya & Moksha ton, Votyak ton, Zyrian te, accusative tenõ, Hungarian te 'you' (singular), ti 'you' (plural), etc. Samoyed: Tavgi tannaŋ, Yeniseian Samoyed tod'i, Selkup tan, tat, Kamassian tan.	Paasonen (1907)
demonstrative pronoun	*so 'this, he/she' (animate nominative singular)	Gothic sa, Sanskrit sá, etc.	*sä 'he/she, it'	Finnish hän (< *sä-n), Saami son, Erzya & Moksha son, Udmurt so. Samoyed: Nganasan syty.	Paasonen (1907)
demonstrative pronoun	*to- 'this, that'	Greek tó, Sanskrit tá-, Old Church Slavic to, etc.	*tä 'this', *to 'that'	Finnish tämä 'this' and tuo 'that (one)', Mari ti 'this', Erzya ťe 'this', Moksha ťä 'this', etc.; Udmurt tu 'that', Moksha tona 'that', Erzya? Moksha? to- 'that'?, etc. Cf. Hungarian tétova 'hesitant' (i.e. reluctant to choose between this and that).	Paasonen (1907)
'who?' (interrogative pronoun)	*kʷi- ~ *kʷe- ~ *kʷo- 'who?, what?'	*kʷi-: Hittite kuis (animate nominative singular), kuit (inanimate nominative–accusative singular), Latin quis, quid, Greek tís, tí, etc. *kʷe-: Greek téo (Homeric), Avestan čahmāi (dative singular; ča < PIE *kʷe), etc. *kʷo-: Latin quod, Old Latin quoius > Latin cuius (genitive singular), Old English hwæt > English what, etc.	*ki ~ *ke ~ *ku ~ *ko 'who?, what?'	Saami gi ~ gä 'who?, which?, what sort of?' and gutti 'who?', Erzya & Moksha koda 'how?', Mari ke, kö, kü 'who?', Hungarian ki 'who?', Finnish kuka 'who?', Komi / Zyrian kod 'which?', Ostyak koji 'who?', kŏti 'what?', etc.	Paasonen (1907)
'who?' (interrogative pronoun)	*kʷi/e/o- + -ne 'who?, what?'	Latin quidne.	*ken 'who?'	Finnish ken ~ kene 'who?', Erzya kije 'who?', Moksha kijä 'who?', Votyak kin 'who?', Udmurt kin 'who?', Komi / Zyrian kin 'who?'. Samoyed: Nenets Samoyed kin 'who?', Southern Nenets kin 'who?'.	
'to give'	*deH₃-	Hittite tā-, Latin dō, Greek dídōmi, Sanskrit dā-, etc.	*toxi	Finnish tuo- 'bring', Estonian too- 'bring', Saami duokə- 'sell', Erzya tuje- 'bring'. Samoyed: Tundra Nenets taš 'give, bring', Enets ta- 'bring', Tavgi tətud'a 'give, bring', etc.	Kortlandt (1989, 2008b)
'to moisten'	*wed-	Sanskrit ud-.	*weti 'water'	Finnish vesi / vete-, Estonian vesi, Erzya & Moksha veď, Udmurt vu, Komi / Zyrian va, Vogul wit, Hungarian víz. Samoyed: Forest Nenets wit, Selkup üt, Kamassian bü, etc.^{1}	Kortlandt (1989)
'water'	*woder-	Hittite wātar (instrumental wēdanda), Umbrian utur (ablative une < *udne), Greek húdōr (genitive húdatos < *hudn̥tos), Sanskrit ud-án- (oblique cases only, nominative–accusative defective), Old Church Slavic voda, Gothic watō (n-stem, dative plural watnam), Old Norse vatn, Old English wæter > English water, etc.^{2}	*weti 'water'	Finnish vesi / vete-, Estonian vesi, Erzya & Moksha veď, Udmurt vu, Komi / Zyrian va, Vogul wit, Hungarian víz. Samoyed: Forest Nenets wit, Selkup üt, Kamassian bü, etc.^{1}	Kortlandt (1989)
'name'	*nomen-	'name' Latin nōmen, Greek ónoma, Sanskrit nā́man-, Old English nama > English name, etc.^{3}	*nimi 'name'	Finnish nimi, Saami nama ~ namma, Erzya & Moksha ľem, Mari lüm, Votyak and Zyrian ńim, Vogul näm, Ostyak nem, Hungarian név. Among the Samoyed languages: Nenets nim, Tavgi ńim, Yenisei Samoyed ńii’, Selkup nim, nem. Compare, in Yukaghir, Kolyma niu and Chuvan nyva.	Paasonen (1907), Kortlandt (1989)
'fish'	*kʷalo- 'large fish'	Latin squalus (with s-mobile) 'large sea fish', Old Prussian kalis 'sheatfish', Old English hwæl 'whale' > English whale, etc.	*kala 'fish'	Finnish kala, Estonian kala, Saami kuollē, Erzya & Moksha kal, Mari kol, Ostyak kul, Hungarian hal; Enets kare, Koibal kola, etc.	Paasonen (1907)
'sister-in-law'	*galou- 'husband's sister'	Latin glōs (genitive glōris), Greek gálōs, Old Church Slavic zŭlŭva, all meaning 'husband's sister'.	*käliw 'sister-in-law'	Finnish käly 'sister-in-law', Estonian käli 'husband's brother, wife of husband's brother', Saami kāloji 'sister-in-law', Erzya kijalo 'sister-in-law', etc.	
'much'	*pḷlu- 'much'	Greek polú-, Sanskrit purú-, Avestan pouru-, Gothic filu, Old High German filu > German viel, all meaning 'much'.^{4}	?*paljɜ 'thick, much'	Finnish paljon 'much', Mari pülä 'rather a lot', Vogul pāľ 'thick', Nenets palɁ 'thick'. Cp. Tundra Yukaghir pojuoŋ 'many'.	
'to go'	*kʷelH-		*kulki-	Finnish kulke- 'go; lead', Erzya koľge- 'leak'.	
'to wash'	*mesg-		*mośki-	Erzya muśke- 'wash'.	Paasonen (1907), Kortlandt (2002)
'pot'	*pot-		*pata		

^{1}Some researchers have interpreted Proto-Uralic *weti as a borrowing from Indo-European that may have replaced a native Proto-Uralic synonym *śäčä everywhere but in some of the northern fringes of the family (most prominently Proto-Samic *čācē).

^{2} This word belongs to the r and n stems, a small group of neuter nouns, from an archaic stratum of Indo-European, that alternate -er (or -or) in the nominative and accusative with -en in the other cases. Some languages have leveled the paradigm to one or the other, e.g. English to the r, Old Norse to the n form.

^{3} Indo-Europeanists are divided on whether to reconstruct this word as *nom(e)n- or as *H₁nom(e)n- with a preceding "laryngeal". Delamarre gives a summary of views, with references. The o timbre of the root is assured by, among others, Greek ónoma and Latin nōmen (with secondary vowel lengthening). As roots with inherent o are uncommon in Indo-European, most roots having e as their vowel, the underlying root is probably *nem-. The -(e)n is an affixal particle. Whether the e placed in parentheses is inherently part of the word is disputed but probable.

^{4} The ḷ in Indo-European *pḷlu- represents a vocalic l, a sound found in English in for instance little, where it corresponds to the -le, and metal, where it corresponds to the -al. An earlier form of the Indo-European word was probably *pelu-.

The following resemblance sets are from Aikio.

Proto-Uralic	Proto-Indo-European	Indo-European example
*aja- ‘drive; flee’	*h_{2}aǵ- ‘drives’	Sanskrit ájati ‘drives’
*kaja ‘dawn / sun’	*h_{2}ay-en/r- ‘day’	Avestan aiiarǝ ‘day’
*kulki- ‘go, run, flow’	*kʷelh_{1}-e- 'moves, walks’	Sanskrit cárati ‘moves, walks’
*teki- ‘do; put’	*dʰeh_{1}- ‘puts’	Sanskrit dádhāti ‘puts’
*toxi- ‘bring’	*doh_{3}- ‘give’	Sanskrit dádāti ‘gives’
*weti ‘water’	*wed-en/r- ‘water’	Hittite wedār ‘water’

== See also ==
- Eurasiatic languages
- Indo-Semitic languages
- Laryngeal theory
- Nostratic languages
- Ural–Altaic languages
- Uralic–Yukaghir languages
- Uralo-Siberian languages

== Bibliography ==
=== Works cited ===
- Anderson, Nikolai (1879). Studien zur Vergleichung der ugrofinnischen und indogermanischen Sprachen [Studies on the Comparison of the Ugro-Finnic and Indo-Germanic Languages] (Thesis). Dorpat: Heinrich Laakmann. hdl:10062/5758. Reprint: ISBN 978-1-146-97660-2
- Anthony, David W. (2007). 'The Horse, the Wheel, and Language. Princeton: Princeton University Press.
- Bomhard, Allan R. (1996). Indo-European and the Nostratic Hypothesis. Charleston, South Carolina: Signum.
- Carpelan, Christian; Parpola, Asko (2001). "Proto-Indo-European, Proto-Uralic and Proto-Aryan". In Carpelan, C.; Parpola, A.; Koskikallio, P. (eds.). The Earliest Contacts between Uralic and Indo-European: Linguistic and Archeological Considerations. Mémoires de la Société finno-ougrienne. Vol. 242. Helsinki. ISBN 952-5150-59-3
- Collinder, Björn (1934). Indo-uralisches Sprachgut [The Indo-Uralic Linguistic Heritage]. Uppsala.
- Collinder, Björn (1954). "Zur indo-uralischen Frage" [On the Indo-Uralic question]. Språkvetenskapliga Sällskapets i Uppsala Förhandlingar. pp. 79–91.
- Collinder, Björn (1960). Comparative Grammar of the Uralic Languages. Stockholm: Almqvist & Viksell.
- Collinder, Björn (1965). "Is the Uralic family isolated?". An Introduction to the Uralic Languages. Berkeley and Los Angeles: University of California Press. pp. 30–34.
- Čop, Bojan. 1970–1989. Indouralica.
  - I.1974. Slovenska Akademija Znanosti in Umetnosti 30.1.
  - II. 1972. Ural-Altaische Jährbucher 44:162–178.
  - III. (Not published.)
  - IV. 1973. Linguistica 13:116–190.
  - V. 1978. Collectanea Indoeuropaea 1:145–196. Ljubljana.
  - VI. (Not published.)
  - VII. 1970. Zeitschrift für vergleichende Sprachforschung (KZ) 84:151–174.
  - VIII. 1974. Acta linguistica Academiae scientarum hungaricae 24:87–116.
  - IX. 1989. Linguistica 29:13–56.
  - X. (Not published.)
  - XI.( Not published.)
  - XII. 1987. Linguistica 27:135–161.
  - XIII. (Not published.)
  - XIV. 1970. Orbis 19.2:282–323.
  - XV. 1974. Zeitschrift für vergleichende Sprachforschung (KZ) 88:41–58.
  - XVI. 1973. Orbis 22:5–42.
  - XVII. (Not published.)
  - XVIII. (Not published.)
- Delamarre, Xavier (2003). Dictionnaire de la langue gauloise. Paris: Editions errance.
- Dolgopolsky, Aharon (1988). "The Indo-European homeland and lexical contacts of Proto-Indo-European with other languages". Mediterranean Language Review. 3. Wiesbaden: Otto Harrassowitz: 7–31.
- Fortescue, Michael (1998). Language Relations across Bering Strait. London and New York: Cassell.
- Greenberg, Joseph (2000–2002). Indo-European and Its Closest Relatives: The Eurasiatic Language Family. Stanford: Stanford University Press.
- Greenberg, Joseph (2005). Croft, William (ed.). Genetic Linguistics: Essays on Theory and Method. Oxford: Oxford University Press.
- Kloekhorst, Alwin (2008a). Etymological Dictionary of the Hittite Inherited Lexicon. Leiden: Brill.
- >Kloekhorst, Alwin (2008b). "Some Indo-Uralic aspects of Hittite" (PDF). Journal of Indo-European Studies. 36: 88–95.
- Koivulehto, Jorma; Ruppel, Klaas Ph (1999). Verba mutuata: Quae vestigia antiquissimi cum Germanis aliisque Indo-Europaeis contactus in linguis Fennicis reliquerint. Mémoires de la société finno-ougrienne. Helsinki: Finnisch-ugrische Gesellschaft. ISBN 978-952-5150-36-0.
- Kortlandt, Frederik (1989). "Eight Indo-Uralic verbs?" (PDF). Münchener Studien zur Sprachwissenschaft. 50: 79–85.
- Kortlandt, Frederik (2002). "The Indo-Uralic Verb" (PDF). Finno-Ugrians and Indo-Europeans: Linguistic and Literary Contacts: Proceedings of the Symposium at the University of Groningen, November 22–24, 2001. Maastricht: Shaker Publishing: 217–227. Archived from the original (PDF) on April 14, 2003.
- Kortlandt, Frederik (2021). The dissolution of the Eurasiatic macrofamily (PDF).
- Lewis, Henry; Pedersen, Holger (1989). A Concise Comparative Celtic Grammar. Göttingen: Vandenhoeck and Ruprecht.
- Paasonen, Heikki (1907). "Zur Frage von der Urverwandschaft der finnisch-ugrischen und indoeuropäischen Sprachen" [On the question of the original relationship of the Finnish-Ugric and Indo-European languages]. Finnisch-ugrische Forschungen. 7: 13–31.
- Pedersen, Holger (1931). Linguistic Science in the Nineteenth Century: Methods and Results. Translated by Spargo, John Webster. Cambridge, Massachusetts: Harvard University Press.
- Pedersen, Holger (1933). "Zur Frage nach der Urverwandschaft des Indoeuropäischen mit dem Ugrofinnischen" [On the question concerning the original relationship of Indo-European with Ugrofinnic]. Mémoires de la Société finno-ougrienne (in German). 67: 308–325.
- Rédei, Károly, ed. (1986a). Uralisches etymologisches Wörterbuch. Translated by Káldor, Mária. Wiesbaden: Harrassowitz.
- Rédei, Károly (1986b). "Zu den indogermanisch-uralischen Sprachkontakten". Sitzungberichte der Österreichischen Akademie der Wissenschaften, philosophisch-historische Klasse. 468.
- Sweet, Henry (1900). The History of Language. London: J.M. Dent & Co. (Reprinted 1901, 1995, 2007.) ISBN 81-85231-04-4 (1995) ISBN 1-4326-6993-1 (2007)
- Thomsen, Vilhelm (1869). Den gotiske sprogklasses indflydelse på den finske (Doctoral thesis). København: University of Copenhagen.
- Thomsen, Vilhelm. 1870. Über den Einfluss der germanischen Sprachen auf die finnisch-lappischen ('On the Influence of the Germanic Languages on Finnish-Lappish'), translated by Eduard Sievers. Halle. (German translation of the previous.) (Reprint: London: RoutledgeCurzon, 1997.) ISBN 0-7007-0887-1 (1997)
- Wiklund, Karl Bernard (1906). "Finnisch-Ugrisch und Indogermanisch" [Finnish-Ugric and Indo-Germanic]. Le monde oriental. 1. Uppsala: 43–65.

=== Further reading ===
- Campbell, Lyle. "Indo-European and Uralic Tree Names". In: Diachronica, Volume 7, Issue 2, Jan 1990, pp. 149-180. ISSN 0176-4225. DOI: https://doi.org/10.1075/dia.7.2.02cam
- Hyllested, Adam. 2010. "Internal reconstruction vs. external comparison: The case of the Indo-Uralic laryngeals." In Internal Reconstruction in Indo-European, edited by Jens Elmegård Rasmussen and Thomas Olander, 111-136. Copenhagen: Museum Tusculanum Press.
- Joki, Aulis J. 1973. Uralier und Indogermanen. Mémoires de la Société Finno-Ougrienne 151. Helsinki: Suomalais-Ugrilainen Seura. ISBN 951-9019-03-0
- Jolkesky, Marcelo. 2004. Uralisches Substrat im Deutsch – oder gibt es eigentlich die indo-uralische Sprachfamilie? Universidade Federal de Santa Catarina.
- Koivulehto, Jorma. 1991. "Uralische Evidenz für die Laryngaltheorie." In Veröffentlichungen der Komission für Linguistik und Kommunikationsforschung 24. Wien: Österreichische Akademie der Wissenschaften. ISBN 3-7001-1794-9
- Koivulehto, Jorma. 2001. "The earliest contacts between Indo-European and Uralic speakers in the light of lexical loans." In The Earliest Contacts between Uralic and Indo-European: Linguistic and Archeological Considerations, edited by C. Carpelan, A. Parpola, and P. Koskikallio. Mémoires de la Société finno-ougrienne 242. Helsinki. ISBN 952-5150-59-3
- Mithen, Steven. 2003. After the Ice: A Global Human History 20,000 – 5000 BC. Orion Publishing Co.
- Sköld, Hannes. 1927. "Indo-uralisch." Finnisch-ugrische Forschungen 18:216-231.
