= Proto-Chukotko-Kamchatkan language =

Common ancestor of the Chukotko-Kamchatkan languages

Proto-Chukotko-Kamchatkan
- Reconstruction of: Chukotko-Kamchatkan languages
- Era: 2000 BCE

Proto-Chukotko-Kamchatkan is the reconstructed common ancestor of the Chukotko-Kamchatkan languages. It is purported to have broken up into the Northern (Chukotian) and Southern (Itelmen) branches around 2000 BCE, when western reindeer herders moved into the Chukotko-Kamchatkans' homeland and its inland people adopted the new lifestyle.

A reconstruction is presented by Michael Fortescue in his Comparative Dictionary of Chukotko-Kamchatkan (2005).

== Phonology ==
According to Fortescue, Proto-Chukotko-Kamchatkan had the following phonemes, expressed in IPA symbols.

=== Consonants ===
	Labial	Alveolar	Palatal	Velar	Uvular
Stop	*p	*t	*c	*k	*q
Fricative	*v	*ð		*ɣ	*ʁ
Nasal	*m	*n		*ŋ	
Approximant	*w	*l	*j		
Rhotic		*r			

*/c/ is a true voiceless palatal stop (not the affricate č). Note that Proto-Chukotko-Kamchatkan had only voiceless stops, no voiced stops (such as /b d ɡ/). However, there is a series of voiced fricatives, */v ð ɣ ʁ/. These have no voiceless counterparts (such as /f θ x/).

*/v/ is a voiced labiodental fricative (like v in English). */ɣ/ is a voiced velar fricative (like the g in Dutch ogen, modern Greek gamma, Persian qāf, etc.). */ʁ/ is a voiced uvular fricative (like r in French).

The entire */t ð n l r/ series is alveolar — i.e. */t ð n/ are not dentals.

=== Vowels ===
	Front	Central	Back
Close	i		u
Mid	e	ə	o
Open	æ		a

== Grammar ==
It is generally accepted that Proto-Chukotko-Kamchatkan had an eleven-case system for nouns, but Dibella Wdzenczny has hypothesised that these evolved from only six cases in Pre-Proto-Chukotko-Kamchatkan. Below is the reconstructed case system of Proto-Chukotko-Kamchatkan.

Case	Declension 1 (singular)	Declension 2 (singular)	Declension 1 (plural)_{1}	Declension 2 (plural)
absolutive	-∅/-(ə)n/-ŋæ/-lŋǝn	-(ǝ)n	-t	-(ǝ)nti
dative	-(ǝ)ŋ	-(ǝ)naŋ		-(ǝ)ðɣǝnaŋ
locative	-(ǝ)k	-(ǝ)næk		-(ǝ)ðǝk
instrumental	-tæ	-(ǝ)næk		-(ǝ)ðǝk
comitative	kæ- -tæ	-		-
associative	ka- -ma	-		-
referential	-kjit	-(ǝ)nækjit		-(ǝ)ðǝkækjit
ablative	-ŋqo(rǝŋ)	-(ǝ)naŋqo(rǝŋ)		-(ǝ)ðǝkaŋqo(rǝŋ)
vialis	-jǝpǝŋ	-(ǝ)najpǝŋ		-(ǝ)ðǝkajpǝŋ
allative	-jǝtǝŋ	-(ǝ)najtǝŋ		-(ǝ)ðǝkajtǝŋ
attributive	-nu	-(ǝ)nu		-(ǝ)ðɣǝnu

_{1}Note that the (mostly inanimate) nouns of the first declension only marked plurality in the absolutive case.

The protolanguage is thought to have been a nominative-accusative language, with the current Chukotko-Kamchatkan ergative aspects coming later in the (Northern) Chukotian branch, possibly through contact with nearby Eskimo–Aleut-speaking peoples. This would explain why Itelmen, spoken further south than any Eskimo–Aleut speakers visited, lacks ergative structures. Some linguists, however, maintain that Proto-Chukotko-Kamchatkan began as an ergative language and lost that feature over time.

== See also ==
- Chukotko-Kamchatkan languages
- Uralo-Siberian languages
