= Nivkh alphabets =

Nivkh alphabets are the alphabets used to write the Nivkh language. During its existence, it functioned on different graphic bases and was reformed several times. Currently, Nivkh writing functions in Cyrillic. There are 3 stages in the history of Nivkh writing:

- before the beginning of the 1930s - the preliterate period;
- 1931-1937 - writing on a Latin basis;
- since 1953 - writing based on the Cyrillic alphabet.

== Pre-literate period ==
According to a study conducted in 1929, the Nivkhs of the lower Amur River had the rudiments of pictographic writing. It was used only to decorate wooden utensils used during the "bear holidays". At these holidays, bear meat was served in wooden ladles, on which images of a bear were applied, as well as symbols indicating the hunting season, the number of bears killed, their gender and age, the number of hunters and other circumstances of the hunt.

Until 1930, no attempts were made to create a real writing system for the Nivkhs. In 1884, the Orthodox Missionary Society published in Kazan the «Гольдскую азбуку для обучения гольдских и гилякских детей» ("Goldes alphabet for teaching Goldes and Gilyak children" - Goldes is an outdated name for the Nanai, Gilyak is an outdated name for the Nivkhs), but all the texts in this alphabet were in the Nanai language. Attempts to apply such an alphabet for the Nivkh language, which is not related to Nanai, can only be considered as a curiosity.

The first experiments in recording the Nivkh language in writing date back to the end of the 19th century: a number of researchers (N. L. Zeland, Leopold von Schrenck, Lev Sternberg) compiled Nivkh dictionaries and recorded some texts. Both Cyrillic and Latin alphabet were used in such records.

== Latin alphabet ==
External image
- ABC-book by E. A. Kreinovich in the Nivkh language made in the Latin alphabet. 1936

In 1931, during the campaign to create a written language for the peoples of the Far North and Far East of the USSR, Kreinovich, Erukhim Abramovich developed the Nivkh alphabet on a Latin basis. According to the original design, it included the letters A a, B в, C c, Ç ç, D d, E e, Ə ə, F f, G g, H h, Ꜧ ꜧ, I i, J j, K k, L l, M m, N n, Ŋ ŋ, O o, P p, Q q, R r, Ŗ ŗ, S s, Ş ş, T t, U u, V v, X x, Z z, Ь ь. However, in February 1932, the following adaptation of the Unified Northern Alphabet was approved instead:

A a	B в	C c	D d	D̦ d̦	E e	Ə ə	F f	G g
H h	Ꜧ ꜧ	I i	J j	K k	Kʻ kʻ	L l	M m	N n
Ņ ņ	Ŋ ŋ	O o	P p	Pʻ pʻ	Q q	Qʻ qʻ	R r	Rʻ rʻ
S s	T t	Ț ț	Tʻ tʻ	U u	V v	X x	Z z

A comma under the letter meant palatalization. In the same year, the primer "Cuzd̦if" was published in this alphabet, followed by other publications. The literary language was based on the Amur dialect. For a short time in Nikolayevsk-on-Amur, the newspaper "Nivxgu mәkәr-qlaj-d̦if" ("The Nivkh truth") was published in this alphabet.

== Cyrillic alphabet ==
External image
- One of the first projects of the Nivkh Cyrillic alphabet. 1936

In 1937, the Nivkh alphabet, like the alphabets of other peoples of the Far North and Far East of the USSR, was officially transferred to the Cyrillic basis - the Russian alphabet with an apostrophe, but without the letters Щ щ, Ъ ъ, Ы ы. The apostrophe was used in the letters Кʼ кʼ, Пʼ пʼ, Рʼ рʼ, Тʼ тʼ, and the digraph Нг нг was also used. However, the publication of any literature in the Nivkh language ceased. Only in 1953, V.N. Savelyeva compiled a Nivkh primer in Cyrillic (Amur dialect). The new alphabet contained all the letters of the Russian alphabet, as well as the letters Гʼ гʼ, Ггʼ ггʼ, Кк кк, Къ къ, Ккъ ккъ, Нʼ нʼ, Пъ пъ, Рш рш, Тъ тъ, Хх хх, Хʼ хʼ. After the release of this primer, book publishing in the Nivkh language ceased again until the early 1980s (with the exception of two dictionaries published in the 1960s and 70s).

The revival of Nivkh writing began in 1977, when the Ministry of Education of the RSFSR began preparing programs on the Nivkh language for primary schools. In 1979, a new Cyrillic alphabet of the Nivkh language was compiled, on the basis of which a primer in the Sakhalin dialect was published in 1981 (authors Vladimir Sangi and Galina Otaina), and in 1982 a primer in the Amur dialect (authors - Chuner Taksami, Mariya Pukhta and Aleksandra Vingun). These primers were followed by other Nivkh books, as well as a newspaper, Nivkh Dif.

Currently, the alphabet of the Sakhalin dialect of the Nivkh language is as follows:

А а	Б б	В в	Г г	Ӷ ӷ	Ғ ғ	Ӻ ӻ	Д д	Е е	Ё ё	Ж ж	З з
И и	Й й	К к	Кʼ кʼ	Ӄ ӄ (Қ қ)	Ӄʼ ӄʼ (Қʼ қʼ)	Л л	М м	Н н	Ӈ ӈ (Ң ң)	О о	П п
Пʼ пʼ	Р р	Р̌ р̌ (Р̆ р̆)	С с	Т т	Тʼ тʼ	У у	Ф ф	Х х	Ӽ ӽ (Ҳ ҳ)	Ӿ ӿ	Ц ц
Ч ч	Ш ш	Щ щ	ъ	Ы ы	ь	Э э	Ю ю	Я я

A number of publications also use the letter Чʼ чʼ. The alphabet of the Amur dialect of the Nivkh language does not contain the letter Ӷ ӷ.

Hooked variants of the letters Ӷ ӷ Ӻ ӻ Қ қ Қʼ қʼ Ң ң Ҳ ҳ are commonly seen, due to the in-house style of Просвещение (Enlightenment) textbook publishing house. Several of these have redundant Unicode characters, namely Ӄ ӄ Ӄʼ ӄʼ Ӈ ӈ Ӽ ӽ. The letters Ӷ ӷ and Ӻ ӻ do not have such duplicate encodings. The diacritic on the ersh may be shaped as either a caron, Р̌ р̌, or as a breve, Р̆ р̆. The ticked variants of the letters, Ӷ ӷ Ӻ ӻ Қ қ Қʼ қʼ Ң ң Р̆ р̆ Ҳ ҳ, continue to be used by the sole Nivkh newspaper, Nivkh dif (Nivx Language).

== Alphabet correspondence table ==
Modern alphabet	Alphabet from 1970 dictionary	Alphabet from 1953 primer	Latinized alphabet (1932–1937)
А а			A a
Б б			B в
В в			V v
Г г			G g
Ӷ ӷ		—	G g
Ғ ғ	ɧ (approx.)	Гʼ гʼ	Ꜧ ꜧ
Ӻ ӻ	Ԧ ԧ	Ггʼ ггʼ	Ꜧ ꜧ
Д д			D d
Е е			E e
Ё ё			—
Ж ж			—
З з			Z z
И и			I i
Й й			J j
К к			K k
Кʼ кʼ		Къ къ	Kʻ kʻ
Ӄ ӄ / Қ қ		Кк кк	Q q
Ӄʼ ӄʼ / Қʼ қʼ		Ккъ ккъ	Qʻ qʻ
Л л			L l
М м			M m
Н н			N n
Ӈ ӈ / Ң ң		Нʼ нʼ	Ŋ ŋ
О о			O o
П п			P p
Пʼ пʼ		Пъ пъ	Pʻ pʻ
Р р			R r
Р̌ р̌ / Р̆ р̆	Рш рш		Rʻ rʻ
С с			S s
Т т			T t
Тʼ тʼ		Тъ тъ	Tʻ tʻ
У у			U u
Ф ф			F f
Х х			H h
Ҳ ҳ		Хх хх	X x
Ӿ ӿ	Һ һ	Хʼ хʼ	X x
Ц ц			—
Ч ч			—
Чʼ чʼ		—	C c
Ш ш			—
Щ щ			—
Ъ ъ			—
Ы ы			—
Ь ь			—
Э э			E e
Ю ю			—
Я я			—
