= Ulch people =

Indigenous ethnic group of Khabarovsk Krai, Russia

Ulchs Alternative names: Ulch, Ul'chi, Ulchi
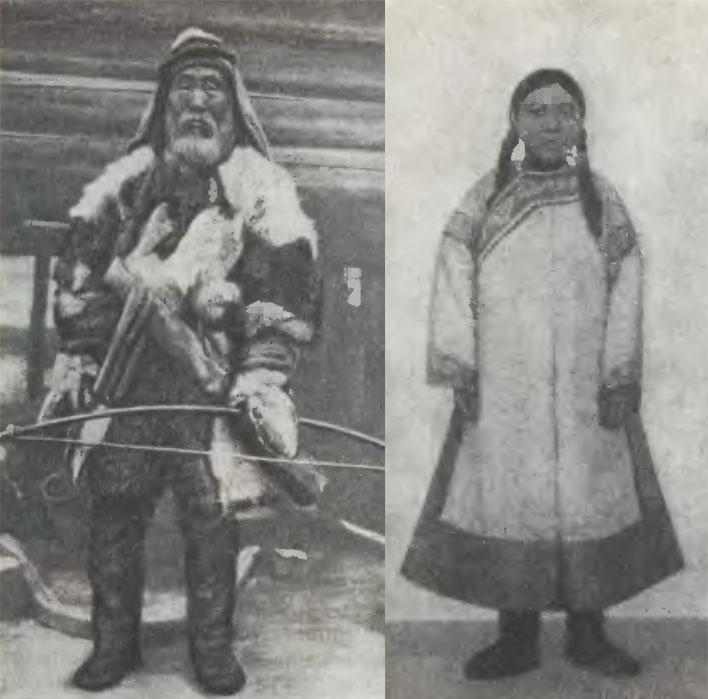

Total population
- 2,913 (2002 estimate)

Regions with significant populations
- Russia: 2,472
- Ukraine: 76

Languages
- Ulch, Russian

Religion
- Shamanism, Russian Orthodoxy

Related ethnic groups
- Orok, Evenki, Negidals, Nanai, Udege,

The Ulch people, also known as Olcha, Olchi or Ulchi, (Russian: ульчи, obsolete ольчи; Ulch: нани, nani) are an Indigenous people of the Russian Far East, who speak a Tungusic language known as Ulch. Over 90% of Ulchis live in Ulchsky District of Khabarovsk Krai, Russia. According to the 2002 census, there were 2,913 Ulchs living in Russia—down from 3,173 recorded in the 1989 census, but up from 2,494 recorded in the 1979 census, and 2,410 recorded in the 1970 census. According to the 2010 census there were 2,765 Ulchs in Russia.

== History ==
Settlement of Ulchi in the Far Eastern Federal District by urban and rural settlements, 2010 census

The Ulch people descend from the autochthonous Paleolithic population of coastal Northeast Asia and were found to be very similar to ancient samples found in this region from about 8000 years ago.

The Ulch people are often classified as one of the ancient Paleosiberian peoples, which is however not an ethno-linguistic group but a term applied to various ethnic groups of Siberia which do not belong to the bigger Northeast Asian populations (such as Turkic, Mongolic and Tungusic populations). Others classify them as one of the Tungusic peoples as their language belongs to the Tungusic languages.

=== Lifestyle ===
The first mention of the Ulchi is from the Russians and dates back to the 17th century.

The Ulchi led a sedentary lifestyle in small villages of two to five houses. The villages had both winter and summer dwellings. The ancient winter dwelling, the "hagdu", was a ground frame structure made of pillars and logs with a gable roof without a ceiling, and an earthen or clay floor. The house was heated by two kanovye hearths. In extreme cold, the Ulch also used large metal braziers on three legs with burning coals. A characteristic feature of the Ulch winter dwelling is the presence of a "dog table", or uycheu - a low platform on which sled dogs were fed. Summer dwellings were of two types - quadrangular made of poles with gable roofs, covered with bark (daura) and pile letniki (gengga). While fishing, the Ulchi built small cylindrical huts.

Fishing is the main branch of their traditional economic complex. Their most important food source was the anadromous salmon. The needs of their catch largely determined the settlement pattern of the Ulchi - along the right bank of the main channel of the Amur, on the main routes of the salmon returning to their spawning grounds. The traditional fishing equipment consisted of gear nets, rides, hook tackle, different types of stocks and the like. Each of them was used, depending on the season, weather conditions, water level in the river, fishing objects, and many other characteristics. Fish were caught both for daily consumption and for storage. The main method of preserving the catch was to make yukola - fish dried in the wind and sun in the form of thin long plates.

Hunting was of secondary importance, mostly fur animals, since furs were in great demand among traders. They mostly hunted Siberian rabbit, squirrel, otter, fox, and most importantly, sable.

At the end of the 19th century, sable was already rare on the Amur, so they went on long expeditions to Sakhalin, to the basins of the Amgun, Gorin and Tumnin, on the coast of the Tatar Strait and on Hokkaido. Ungulates (elk, deer) were hunted all year round using crossbows. Hunting for sea animals also played a significant role in their economic life, and they caught seals and sea lions.

=== Clothing ===
The upper summer clothing for men and women was kimono-cut cloth capchum robes with a left hem that was fastened on the right side. Ornaments on men's clothing were rare. Winter clothing was insulated (quilted on cotton wool). In winter, fur coats were also worn, cut like a robe and covered on top with cotton or silk fabric. Winter hats looked like a hood with a top made of white dog kamuses and a fox trim around the face. In severe frosts, a devil's fur earmuffs were worn under such a hat. In the summer they used birch bark hats. Shoes were made of fish, deer and elk leather (rovduga), seal and sea lion leather.

The term "shaved-head people" was used to describe the Nanai people by Ulch people.

=== Genetics ===
According to Sukernik et al. (2012), the mitochondrial DNA of the present-day Ulchi population belongs predominantly to haplogroup Y1a (69/160 = 43.1%), which is shared with Nivkhs, Koryaks, and Evens and is estimated to have a time to most recent common ancestor of approximately 6,000 (95% CI 3,300 <-> 8,800) years before present on the basis of complete genomes or approximately 1,800 (95% CI 800 <-> 2,900) years before present on the basis of synonymous positions. Another 20% of the present-day Ulchi population belongs to mitochondrial DNA haplogroup D, which is significantly more diverse than their haplogroup Y1a mtDNA and can be resolved as follows: 12/160 = 7.5% D4o2, 4/160 = 2.5% D4h, 3/160 = 1.9% D4e4, 3/160 = 1.9% D4j, 2/160 = 1.25% D3, 2/160 = 1.25% D4c2, 1/160 = 0.6% D4a1, 1/160 = 0.6% D4b2b, 1/160 = 0.6% D4g2b, 1/160 = 0.6% D4m2, 1/160 = 0.6% D4o1, 1/160 = 0.6% D5a. Haplogroups C (20/160 = 12.5%, including 11/160 = 6.9% C5, 5/160 = 3.1% C4b, 3/160 = 1.9% C4a1, 1/160 = 0.6% C1a) and G (14/160 = 8.75%, including 12/160 = 7.5% G1b and 2/160 = 1.25% G2a1) are also well represented. The remainder of the Ulchi mitochondrial DNA pool consists of haplogroups N9b (7/160 = 4.4%), M8a (6/160 = 3.75%), F1a (5/160 = 3.1%), M7 (4/160 = 2.5%), M9a1 (1/160 = 0.6%), Z1 (1/160 = 0.6%), and B5b2 (1/160 = 0.6%).

According to a study by Balanovska et al. (2018), present-day Ulchi males belong to Y-DNA haplogroups C-M217(xM48, M407) (18/52 = 34.6%), C-M48 (18/52 = 34.6%, including 9/52 = 17.3% C-M86/F12355(xB470, F13686), 4/52 = 7.7% C-F13686, 1/52 = 1.9% C-B470, and 4/52 = 7.7% C-B93(xGG_16645386), the last of which is a deeply divergent branch belonging to C-M48(xM86)), O-M175 (8/52 = 15.4%, including 6/52 = 11.5% O-M122(xP201), 1/52 = 1.9% O-M119, and 1/52 = 1.9% O-P31), Q-M242(xM120) (3/52 = 5.8%), N-M231 (3/52 = 5.8%, including 1/52 = 1.9% N-M231(xM128, P43, M178), 1/52 = 1.9% N-M2118, and 1/52 = 1.9% N-B479), I-P37 (1/52 = 1.9%), and J–M267(xP58) (1/52 = 1.9%).

The population genetics of the Ulchi are linked to 7,700 year old remains from Chertovy Vorota Cave ("Devil's Gate") and are also genetically similar to an East Asian genetic component within Native Americans. The Ulchi do not appear to have originally possessed the "Ancient North Eurasian" (ANE) genetic component found in low frequency in Native Americans and Central Asian, as well as in higher percentage in South Asian, and West Eurasian (European and Middle Eastern) populations; and thus are suggested to represent the East Asian component of Native Americans. But there is evidence of gene flow from Central Asian and Far East populations over the past 1000 to 3000 years. 6.0% of modern Ulchi also share an ancestral component unique to a 2500-year-old Jōmon individual.

== Language ==
The Ulch language belongs to the southern (Amur) branch of the Tungusic languages. Along with the languages of the Nanai people and the Oroks, it contains relics of the ancient pre-Tungusic Amuric vocabulary, which makes it possible to consider the ancestors of the Ulchi as one of the most ancient inhabitants of the Amur region.

== Religion ==
The traditional religion of the Ulchi, as well as of other peoples of the Amur region, is expressed by animism and shamanism. A large role in the social life of the Ulchi is their system of cults of family and ancestors (ancestor worship). Their religion bears similarities to the religion of the Nivkh people and Ainu people.

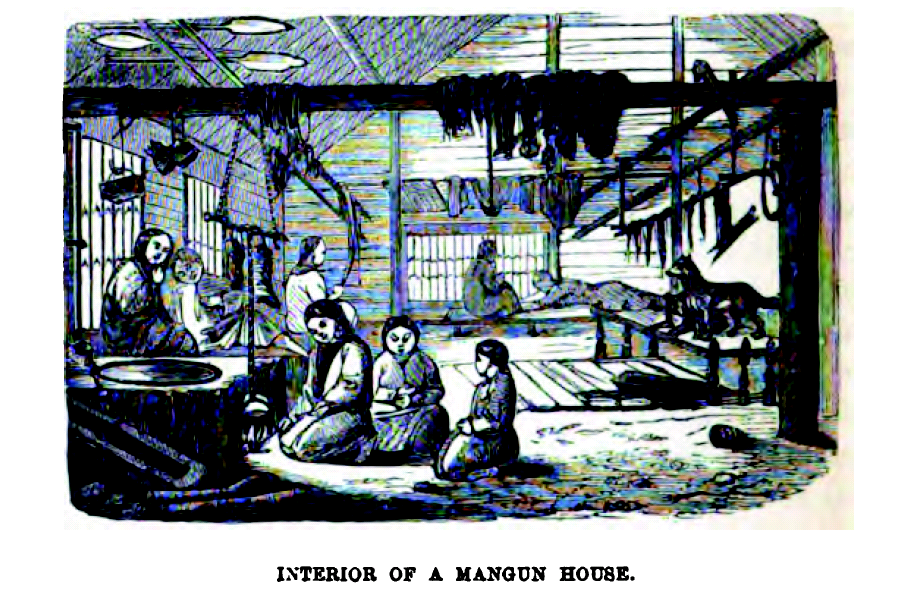
Interior of a Mangun House, drawing by Richard Maack ca. 1854-1860
