= Marina Temina =

Russian teacher of the Nivkh languages

- Марина Тэмина
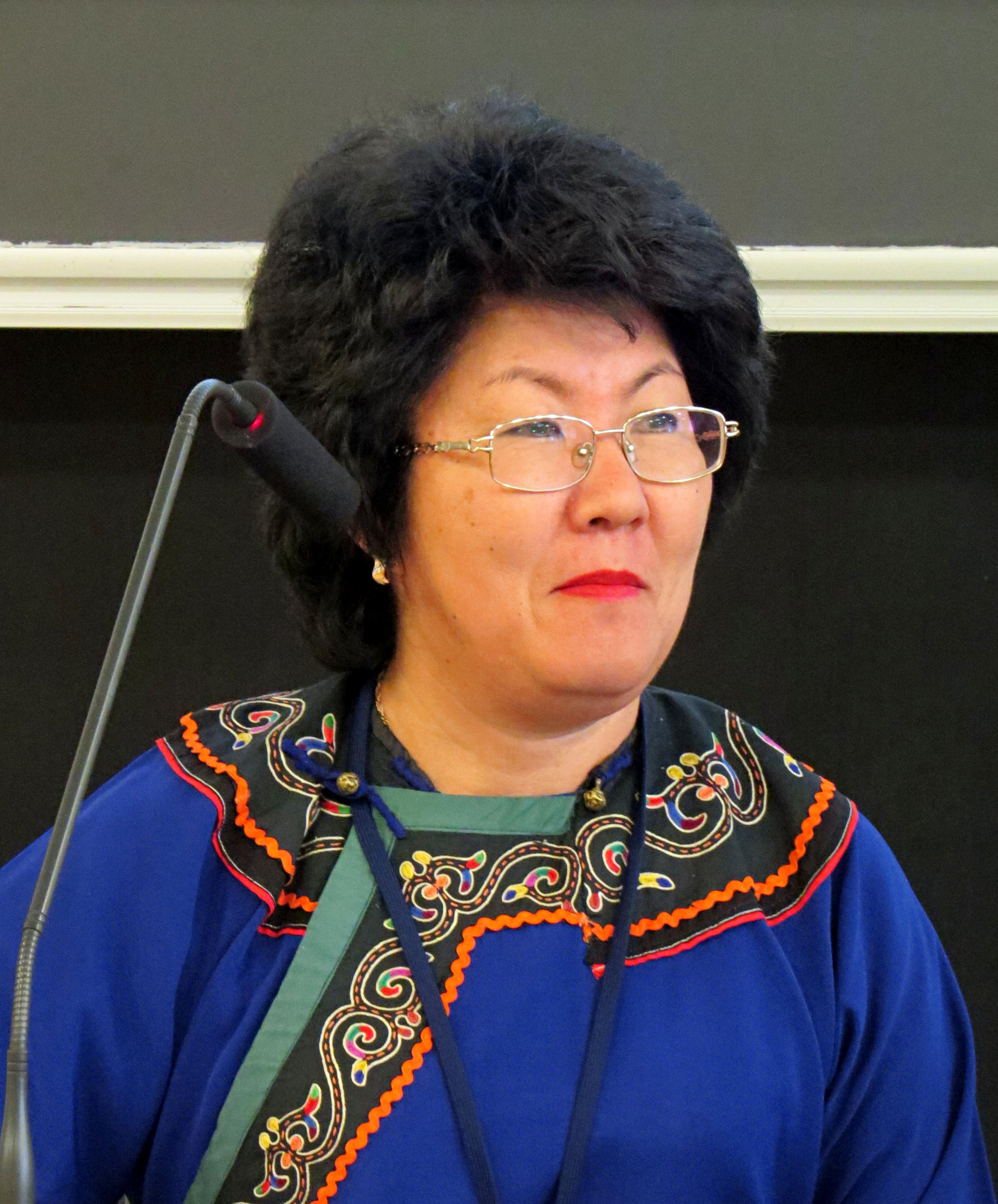
- Temina at the Árran conference in Norway in 2019
- Born: Nikolayevsk-on-Amur, Khabarovsk Krai, Soviet Union
- Citizenship: Russia
- Occupation: Nivkh teacher
- Years active: 1994–present
- Known for: Developing learning aids for teaching and learning Nivkh

Marina Grigoryevna Temina (Russian: Марина Григорьевна Тэмина) is a Russian teacher known for her work promoting the learning of the Nivkh languages through the development of learning aids such as textbooks and a mobile app.

== Early life and education ==
Temina was born and raised in Nikolayevsk-on-Amur, Khabarovsk Krai, in what was then the Soviet Union. Born into a Nivkh family, Temina spoke the Amur dialect of the Nivkh language with her parents, though her primary language, as well as the language of her education, was Russian. Optional Nivkh classes were not added to the curriculum in Khabarovsk Krai until Temina was in high school. Nivkh is spoken in the Nikolayevsky and Ulchsky districts of Khabarovsk, primary in small settlements along the Amur and on the shores of the Amur Liman, as well as on the island of Sakhalin.

After initially training as an English teacher, in 1994 Temina began studying Nivkh at the Institute of the Peoples of the North, under Nivkh linguist Lyudmila Gashilova. Temina's dissertation was on the significance of bear festivals in Nivkh culture.

As of 2024, Temina is studying for a PhD in history.

== Career ==
After completing her course at the Institute of the Peoples of the North, in which she learned both Nivkh grammar as well as language teaching techniques, Temina began teaching English and Nivkh at the Nikolayevsk Pedagogical College (now the Nikolayevks Industrial and Humanitarian College). Temina specifically taught the Amur dialect of Nivkh, spoken in Khabarovsk Krai; she went on to co-author, with Irina Kravchenko, a first grade textbook on the language, followed by authoring a textbook used by third and fourth grade Nivkh users in the Nikolayevsky and Ulchsky districts. In addition to her development of Nivkh learning aids, Temina's work and research has also included the ethnography, lexicology, toponymy and onomastics of Nivkh, as well as the work of the Nivkh linguist Galina Otaina.

Alongside Nivkh elder Albina Yushkina, Temina has been credited with the promotion of the learning of the Amur dialect of Nivkh, alongside Vladimir Sangi, who worked in the Sakhalin dialect. In 2016, Temina amended her own Amur textbook to match the rules of the Sakhalin dialect, with the textbook being introduced in Nivkh classes in Nogliki, Sakhalin Oblast. Temina is an associate professor at the Institute for Education Development of Khabarovsk Krai.

In 2022, Temina participated in the construction of Nivkh dif (Russian: Нивх диф), a Nivkh-language learning app, with support from the Federal Agency for Youth Affairs. Temina provided audio clips and a phrasebook for the app, which was released to mark the 2022 All-Russian Forum of Youth of Indigenous Peoples of the North, Siberia and the Far East of the Russian Federation.

Temina is the head of the Association of Teachers of Native Languages and Cultures of Indigenous Peoples of the North in Khabarovsk Krai, Sakhalin Oblast and Primorsky Krai (Russian: Ассоциации учителей родных языков и культуры коренных малочисленных народов Севера Хабаровского края, Сахалинской области и Приморского края, romanized: Assotsiatsii uchiteley rodnykh yazykov i kultury korennykh malochislennykh narodov Severa Khabarovskogo kraya, Sakhalinskoy oblasti i Primorskogo kraya), founded in 2021. She was re-elected in 2024. Temina is also a member of the executive board of the Association of Teachers of Native Language and Literature of Indigenous Minorities of the North and Far East.

== Recognition ==
The Russian Museum of Ethnography recognised Temina, as well as Chuner Taksami and Galina Otaina, for their work preserving and documenting Nivkh culture, in its 2026 exhibition "Nivkh and Uiltsa: the unity of people and nature" (Russian: Нивхи и уйльта: единство людей и природы, romanized: Nivkhi i uylta: yedinstvo lyudey i pripody).

In 2024, Temina received the first Amur Virgin award from the Legislative Duma of Khabarovsk Krai, given by the Governor of Khabarovsk Krai, to figures who have provided outstanding service to the region.
