= List of Nivkh settlements =

List of notable Nivkh (Gilyak) settlements in Sakhalin Island and the Lower Amur River. Prior to 1905 settlements are listed from north to south in their geographical categories with most settlement names in the Nivkh language or in the only known given Russian name.

== Nivkh population in 2002 ==
The settlements with Nivkh population according to the Russian Census of 2002 (excluding Khabarovsk, Poronaysk and Yuzhno-Sakhalinsk).

According to the Russian Census of 2002 most Nivkhs have lived in following districts: Ulchsky, Nikolayevsky of Khabarovsk Krai and Alexandrovsk-Sakhalinsky, Nogliksky, Okhinsky of Sakhalin Oblast. Some Nivkhs live outside of their native area in big citites of Khabarovsk, Yuzhno-Sakhalinsk and Poronaysk.

Khabarovsk Krai
Russian name	English name	Number of Nivkhs	Total population	Percentage of Nivkhs
г. Николаевск-на-Амуре	Nikolaevsk-on-Amur	407	28,492	1.4%
г. Хабаровск	Khabarovsk	131	583,072	0.02%
село Иннокентьевка	Innokentyevka	129	664	19.4%
село Тахта	Takhta	118	937	12.6%
пгт. Лазарев	Lazarev	117	1,954	6.0%
посёлок Тыр	Tyr	89	729	12.2%
село Кальма	Kalma	85	139	61.2%
посёлок Нижнее Пронге	Nizhneye Pronge	82	461	17.8%
посёлок Пуир	Puir	77	269	28.6%
село Богородское	Bogorodskoye	77	4,119	1.9%
пгт. Многовершинный	Mnogovershinny	73	2,798	2.6%
село Сусанино	Susanino	62	882	7.0%
село Красное	Krasnoye	60	1,251	4.8%
пгт. Маго	Mago	56	2,244	2.5%
село Оремиф	Oremif	54	325	16.6%
село Алеевка	Aleyevka	49	65	75.4%
село Ухта	Ukhta	45	175	25.7%
село Нижняя Гавань	Nizрnyaya Gavan	40	377	10.6%
село Воскресенское	Voskresenskoye	36	114	31.6%
село Константиновка	Konstantinovka	35	908	3.9%
село Тнейвах	Tneyvakh	33	55	60.0%
село Булава	Bulava	30	2,226	1.3%
село Белоглинка	Beloglinka	30	89	33.7%
село Макаровка	Makarovka	22	26	84.6%
посёлок Чныррах	Chnyrrakh	21	455	4.6%
село Чля	Chlya	20	933	2.1%
село Солонцы	Solontsy	18	570	3.2%
село Власьево	Vlasyevo	11	39	28.2%
посёлок Октябрьский	Oktyabrsky	11	170	6.5%
село Сахаровка	Sakharovka	10	85	11.8%

Sakhalin Oblast
Russian name	English name	Number of Nivkhs	Total population	Percentage of Nivkhs
пгт. Ноглики	Nogliki	647	10,604	6.1%
село Некрасовка	Nekrasovka	572	1,126	50.8%
г. Оха	Okha	299	27,795	1.1%
село Чир-Унвд	Chir-Unvd	200	291	68.7%
г. Поронайск	Poronaysk	116	17,844	0.7%
г. Южно-Сахалинск	Yuzhno-Sakhalinsk	98	170,356	0.1%
село Рыбное	Rybnoye	56	84	66.7%
посёлок Трамбаус	Trambaus	45	105	42.9%
село Москальво	Moskalvo	44	807	5.5%
г. Александровск-Сахалинский	Alexandrovsk-Sakhalinsky	29	12,693	0.2%
село Виахту	Viakhtu	26	286	9.1%
посёлок Луполово	Lupolovo	21	28	75.0%
село Вал	Val	19	1211	1.6%
село Венское	Venskoye	14	15	93.3%
пгт. Катангли	Katangli	17	896	1.9%
посёлок Рыбобаза-2	Rybobaza-2	11	34	32.4%

== Nivkh settlements before 1905 ==
Amur Estuary

- Nikolaevsk
- Lazatev

West Sakhalin Coast

- Tamlavo
- Ngyl'vo
- Valuevo
- Langry
- Chingai
- Pyrki
- Pogibi
- Uandi
- Ytyk'
- Viakhtu
- Khoe
- Tangi
- Arkovo
- Port Aleksandrovsk

Sakhalin Bay

- Rybnoe
- Visk'vo
- Pomyt'
- Nil'vo
- Matnyr'
- Ngyd'
- Koibgervo

East Sakhalin Coast

- Khankes'
- Urkdt'
- Pil'tun (island)
- Kakervo
- Kharkor'vo
- Chaivo
- Lad'vo
- Tyrmyts'
- Vachi
- Mil'kovo
- Tagry
- Lub'vo
- Lung'yo
- Nappi
- Ngamb'vo

Tym River

- Yukyr'
- Chkharvo
- Slavo
- Uskovo
- Tymovo
- Rykovskoe
