= Institute of the Peoples of the North =

Russian research institute

- Институт Народов Севера
- Established: 1930; 96 years ago
- Parent institution: Herzen University (since 1948)
- Location: Saint Petersburg, Russia

The Institute of the Peoples of the North (Russian: Институт Народов Севера, romanized: Institut Narodov Severa, Mansi: Лӯиса̄м ма̄хум институт, romanized: Lūisām māhum inst́itut) is a research and higher education institute based in Saint Petersburg. Its objective is to examine topics related to the northern minorities in the Soviet Union, and to prepare teachers for the northern boarding schools. One of the central figures involved in the research institute was Vladimir Bogoraz.

== History ==
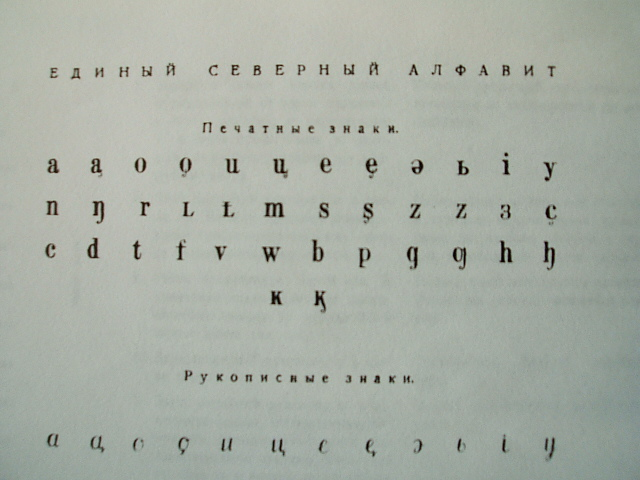
Early project of the Latin-based Unified Northern Alphabet in 1930.

The institute was founded in 1930, as four years previously, it had become possible to study the languages of the northern peoples in their own right at the Institute for Eastern Studies at Leningrad State University. By the end of 1929, the institute's teachers had joined forces to create the Unified Northern Alphabet for use by the linguistic minorities living in the north of the Soviet Union. The alphabet consisted of 32 Latin-based letters, some of which were equipped with diacritics. For practical reasons, i.e., typographical reasons, a move to rid the alphabet of graphemes using diacritics was made and one year later a new version was ready. On December 13, 1930, the Presidium of the Scientific Investigation Association at the institute presented a version of the Unified Northern Alphabet to the Scientific Council of the USSR's Central Committee on Alphabet Adaptation (Russian: Всесоюзного центрального комитета нового алфавита, romanized: Vsesoyuznogo tsentral'nogo komiteta novogo alfavita). The same body discussed the draft again on December 18 and it was approved on February 23, 1931. The scientific section of Narkompros approved the draft in May the same year. The alphabet consisted of 39 letters: 29 consonants and 10 vowels. In addition, some letters were marked with diacritics to show palatalization, length and aspiration.

A publishing campaign was launched after the alphabet had been formally approved. From 1939 to 1949, approximately 300 experts were employed by the institute.

The finalisation of principles for the creation of a literary public institution for the peoples of the north came at the first pan-Russian conference. Delegates to the conference (which was held at the INS in Leningrad) were representatives for Narkompros, Komitet Severa v/Presidium VCIK, CK Novogo Alfavita SSSR i RSFSR, and the publisher Učpedgiz. In the work conducted at the conference, there were participants from the national northern okrugs, for the local Northern Committees, for CK VLKSM, for the soviet Academy of Sciences, for the Historical-linguistic institute in Leningrad, and for the Northern department at the Leningrad Herzen Pedagogical Institute. The preparation work was done at INS.

The conference decided to create orthographies for a total of 16 languages and to have books available for the 15th anniversary of the revolution:

- The Uralic languages: Nenets, Selkup, Khanty, Mansi and Kildin Sami
- The Tungusic languages: Evenki, Even, Nanai and Udege
- The Paleosiberian languages: Chukchi, Koryak, Itelmen, Siberian Yupik, Aleut, Nivkh and Ket

Various books, including primers and math textbooks, were published using this alphabet.

== After World War II ==
The institute was run in its original form from 1930 until 1941. Between 1942 and 1945, the institute was located in Omsk, after which it moved back to Leningrad as a part of the Faculty of Oriental Studies at Leningrad State University. Since 1948, the institute has been a part of the Herzen University, to which it still belongs today.

== Notable people ==
- Nina Afanasyeva (b. 1939), Russian-Sami politician and language activist
- Maria Barmich (1934–2023), Nenets linguist, professor, author of Nenets textbooks
- Marina Temina, Nivkh teacher

== Bibliography ==
- Алькор (Кошкин), Я. П. (1932). Письменность народов Севера (in Russian). Ленинград: Институт Народов Севера.
- Алавердова, К. (1933). Язык и письменность народов СССР. Стенографический отчет 1-го Всесоюзного пленума Научного совета ВЦК НА 15-19 февраля 1933 г. (in Russian). ВЦК НА.
- Isa(y)ev, M.I. (1977). National Languages in the USSR: problems and solutions. Moscow: Izdatel’stvo Progress.
- Цинциус, В. И. (1958). Родной язык в начальных школах народов Крайнего Севера (in Russian). Ленинград.
