= Punaluan family =

Punaluan family is a polygamous and polyandrous heterosexual family structure formed by an individual, his spouse, his siblings spouses, the siblings of his spouse and their siblings spouses and their children. This type of group marriage is called a Puanulan marriage. The relationship can be considered a form of paramour.

== Description ==
The term originated in Lewis H. Morgan's book Ancient Society (1877), based on several reports, including a 1860 letter from Judge Lorrin Andrews, describing the Hawaiians system of consanguinity called punalua.

In this type of system, a man is married with his wife and also with his brother's wives. The opposite is also true, where a woman is married with her husband and with her sister's husbands. The marriage is sometimes extended to the rest of the family. For instance, in the Hawaiian case, a man would be also married with his wife's sisters. But the husbands of his wife's sisters are called a punalua. (Note: There is no exact translation to the word punalua to English, as it means a "type of relationship between first and secondary mates".) The relatives, their spouses and their children form a family nucleolus named Punaluan family.

The Hawaiian Punalua family was originated from pre-missionary times, where it was accepted for a man or woman to have multiple partners. Punalua, then meant the joint responsibility to take care of the children.

== Evolution of the marriage system ==
Morgan created the concept of the Punaluan family to explain the origin of the modern family. According to him, the Punaluan family was created by tribes evolving from the "status of savagery" to exclude brothers, sisters and in some cases collateral brothers and sisters from intercourse. He further suggests that this system would be expanded by the creation of "gens", where the marriage between the descendants of the female lineage would also be forbitten. This would not happen to males, as paternity is much harder to determine. The new system would make the availability of women scarcer, thus evolving to a new form of "lower status barbaric" system, the Syndyasmian family, where wives were sought through purchase or capture.

Morgan further subdivided this stage of marital evolution in two phases: the Malayan and the Turano-Gawoanian systems, where the Malayan system differs the kingship only by generation, and the later also differs by patrilateral and matrilateral kingship, that would later evolve to a clan society. This was later disproved, as the Malayan system was actually newer then the Turano-Gawoanian system, as it was a result of the disintegration of their clan society.

Morgan's ideas were very influential in marxism, but Friedrich Engels, in his book The Origin of the Family, Private Property and the State (1884), argues that the Punaulan family is not a necessary stage for the development of the modern family and marriage.

== Examples ==
Morgan gives several examples of Pualuan marriage in Ancient Society. Some of them are the Aboriginal Australians, the Venezuelan indigenous population, the Britons, based on the description of the Roman emperor Julius Caesar, and the Massagetae, based on the description of Herodotus.

The Nivkhi have a triangulated system of marital exchange based on a tri-clan phratry or alliance group (pandf), that according to Lev Sternberg was very similar to the Punaluan marriage. Any Nivkhi men have sexual access to women their own generation in the wife-giving lineage and vice-versa.

Some ancient cultures have been theorized of practicing Punaluan marriage. One example is the Yangshao culture, based on studies of the Jiangzhai village archeological site housing distribution.
