= Maria Barmich =

Russian linguist (1934–2023)

Maria Yakovlevna Barmich
- Born: 26 April 1934; Zapolyarny District, Northern Krai, Russian SFSR, USSR
- Died: 27 November 2023 (aged 89)
- Education: Herzen University
- Occupation: Linguist
- Notable work: Nenets textbooks

Maria Yakovlevna Barmich (Russian: Мари́я Я́ковлевна Ба́рмич; 26 April 1934 – 27 November 2023) was a Russian professor, researcher of the Nenets language, and the first scientist among Nenets women.

Barmich was born in the Kaninskaya tundra of the Kanino-Timan region of the Nenets Autonomous Okrug, Arkhangelsk Oblast. She lived in Saint Petersburg and worked at the Institute of the Peoples of the North. She taught the Nenets language for many years and was an author of textbooks on the Nenets language, culture, and life.

On 9 December 2016, in Naryan-Mar, she was a judge for the competition Vadava Letrakhava (Let's save our Native language).

Barmich died from a stroke on 27 November 2023, at the age of 89.
