= Nivkh mythology =

Nivkh mythology is the mythology of the Nivkhs, a small nation living around upper Amur river and on Sakhalin. Individual folk tales (tylgund) were first recorded as oral tradition by Bronisław Piłsudski and published by L. Ya. Sternberg. Later, Nivkh folklore was collected and processed by A. Veselovsky, E. A. Kreinovich, G. A. Otaina, and V. Sangi. According to Veselovsky, the Nivkh epic had not yet been fully formed by the time it was studied; the opposite opinion is held by the Nivkh writer and folklore researcher Sangi. The latter wrote various Nivkh legends and tales in literary adaptations.

The subject matter of Nivkh tales is quite characteristic: myths about the moon and the sun, tales about finding good luck and relationships with the other world. Despite the stories about battles with forest, mountain, taiga, underground peoples, in general the heroic component in mythology is absent.

In addition to tylgund, there are also nastund - an improvisational myth, ker-aind - a short epic tale, and tales about animals.

One of the legends recorded by Piłsudski contains a story about a thing known in various mythologies as vagina dentata - a vagina with teeth.

== See also ==
- Nivkhs
