= Alexey Limanzo =

Russian politician and activist

Alexey Limanzo, President of the Association of Indigenous Peoples of North Sakhalin Region, is the chairman of the council of the indigenous people plenipotentiary of Sakhalin Island. He serves as a minority rights officer, acting to the behest of the concerns of Siberian natives in relation to the Russian government and its activity.

== See also ==
- Nivkh people
