= Nivkh people =

Ethnic group of far eastern Russia

Nivkh
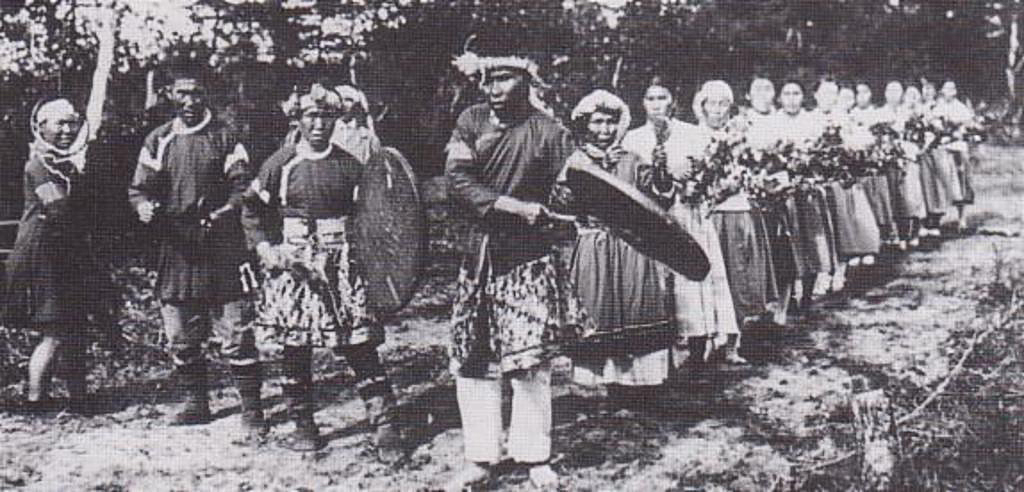
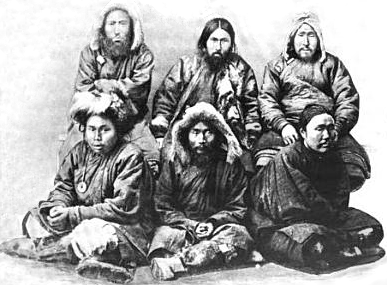
- A group of Nivkh people Nivkh men, 1902

Regions with significant populations
- Russia: Khabarovsk Krai: 2,452 (2002); Sakhalin Oblast: 2,450 (2002); Saint Petersburg: 35 (2002); Jewish Autonomous Oblast: 32 (2002); Primorsky Krai: 29 (2002): 4,652 (2010)
- Ukraine: 584 (2001)

Languages
- Nivkh, Russian, Japanese

Religion
- Shamanism, Russian Orthodox Christianity

Related ethnic groups
- Paleosiberians, Ainu, Okhotsk, Mishihase, Kamchadals, and Ulchi

The Nivkh (also known as Nivkhs and formerly as Nivkhi, Gilyak or Gilyaks; ethnonym: Нивхгу, Nʼivxgu around the Amur, or Ниғвңгун, Nʼiɣvŋgun in East Sakhalin; "the people") are an indigenous ethnic group inhabiting the northern half of Sakhalin Island and the lower Amur River and coast on the adjacent Russian mainland. Historically, they may have inhabited parts of Manchuria.

Settlements with Nivkh populations according to the Russian Census of 2002 (excluding Khabarovsk, Poronaysk and Yuzhno-Sakhalinsk).

Settlement of Nivkhs in the Far Eastern Federal District by urban and rural settlements in%, 2010 census

Nivkh were traditionally fishermen, hunters, and dog breeders. They were semi-nomadic, living near the coasts in the summer and wintering inland along streams and rivers to catch salmon. The land the Nivkh inhabit is characterized as taiga forest with cold snow-laden winters and mild summers with sparse tree cover. The Nivkh are believed to be the original inhabitants of the region, and to derive from a proposed Neolithic people that migrated from the Transbaikal region during the Late Pleistocene.

The Nivkh had long maintained trade and cultural relations with neighboring China and Japan. Previously within Qing China's sphere of influence, the Russian Empire annexed the region following two treaties in 1858 and 1860. Subsequently, traditional Nivkh lifestyle was significantly altered by colonization and collectivization.

Today, the Nivkh live in Russian-style housing and, with the overfishing and pollution of the streams and seas, have adopted many foods from Russian cuisine. Most Nivkh speak Russian, and less than five percent speak their native Nivkh language. Nivkh is considered a language isolate or small family, although it is grouped for convenience with the Paleosiberian languages. Nivkh is divided into four dialects or languages. The Nivkh practice shamanism, which is important for the winter Bear Festival, though some have converted to Russian Orthodoxy. The population of Nivkhs according to successive Russian censuses is 3,842 (2021 census); 4,652 (2010 census); 5,287 (2002 census);

== Etymology ==
Nivkh (plural Nivkhgu in the Nivkh language), an endonym, means "person" in the Nivkh language. They may also be referred to as Nivkhi in 1920s Western literature, due to the romanization of the Russian term plural "нивхи" from "нивх" (nivkh). In the seventeenth and eighteenth centuries, Russian explorers first termed the group Gilyak, also Giliaks or Giliatski.

The etymology of the name "Gilyak" is disputed by linguists, with some believing the name originated from an exonym given to the Nivkhs by a nearby Tungusic group. Other scholars believe that "Gilyak" derives from Kile, another nearby Tungusic group that the Russians had mistakenly named Nivkhs. "Gilyak" is the Russian rendering of terms derived from the Tungusic "Gileke" and Manchu-Chinese "Gilemi" (Gilimi, Gilyami) for culturally similar peoples of the Amur River region, and was applied principally to the Nivkh in Western literature.

== Origins ==
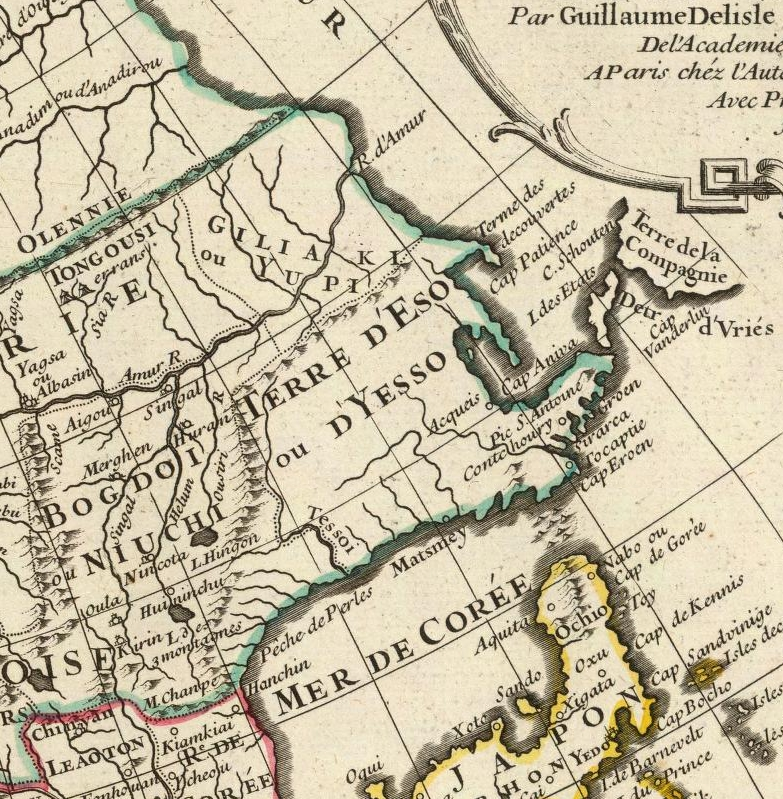
Giliaki or Yupi (meaning "[people wearing clothes made of] fish-skin"; a Chinese exonym also used for the Nani people) on an early-18th-century French map depicting the Vries Strait and the Strait of Tartary.

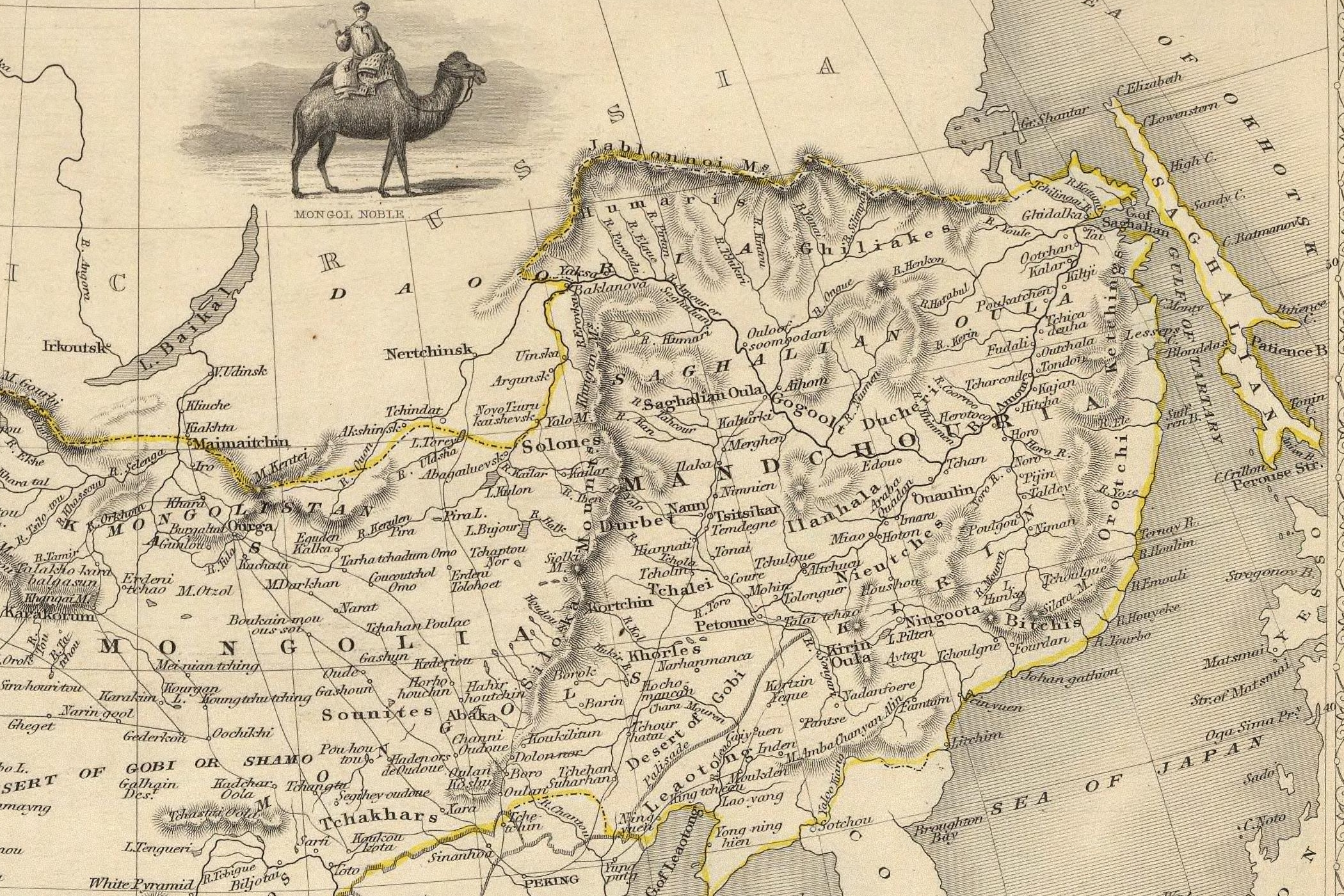
Ghiliakes to the east of Daooria, closer to the mouth of the Amur River

The origins of the Nivkh are hard to discern from current archaeological research. Their subsistence by fishing and coastal sea-mammal hunting is very similar to the Koryak and Itelmen on the Kamchatka Peninsula. The rigging of dog-sledges is also similar to these Chukotko-Kamchatkan groups. Spiritual beliefs are similar to those of the Northwest Coast Indians of North America, whose ancestors migrated from this area.

The Nivkh are physically and genetically different from the surrounding peoples, and scholars believe they are the indigenous inhabitants of the area. The current archaeological model suggests that a sub-Arctic microlithic culture originating from the Transbaikal region migrated across Siberia and populated the Amur and Sakhalin region during the Late Pleistocene, or perhaps earlier. Scientists believe that people of this culture were the first to migrate eastward into the Americas.

The microlithic culture was technologically adept in the harsh climate of Siberia during the last ice age. After the ice receded, Tungusic peoples from the south pressed into the warmer northern areas, soon dominating the settled peoples. The Nivkh are considered the last surviving ethnic group able to adapt to the warmer climate and not be assimilated or squeezed out by the newcomers, hence the Nivkh isolate language. The earliest archeological radiocarbon dating for Northern Sakhalin as of 2004 is the Neolithic Age Imchin Site 2, dated to 4950–4570 BC near the Tym' River estuary on the west coast.

Michael Fortescue suggests that Nivkh might be related to the Mosan languages of North America (however, Mosan is generally considered a Sprachbund rather than a language family). Fortescue also presents evidence that Nivkh is related to the Chukotko-Kamchatkans, forming a Chukotko-Kamchatkan–Amuric family, though the evidence was judged to be "insufficient" by Glottolog.

More recently, Sergei Nikolaev argued in two papers for a systematic relationship between Nivkh and the Algic languages of North America and a more distant relationship between these two together and the Wakashan languages of coastal British Columbia.

== History ==
=== Pre-modern history ===
The Sakhalin Nivkhs populated the island during the Late Pleistocene period, when the island was connected to the Continent of Asia via the exposed Strait of Tartary. When the ice age receded, the oceans rose and the Nivkh were split into two groups. It is suggested that the Nivkh people were present in a wide area of Northeast Asia and influenced other people and their cultures. Nivkhs may be related to the Susuya, Okhotsk, and Tobinitai culture that reached Hokkaido and met the Satsumon culture.

Several historians suggest that the Nivkh were present in the kingdom of Goguryeo. There are indications that the ancestors of the Nivkh may have played a much more prominent role in pre- and protohistorical Manchuria. Nivkh lands extended along the northern coast of Manchuria from the Russian fortress at Tugur Bay eastward to the mouth of the Amur River at Nikolayevsk, then south through the Strait of Tartary as far as De Castries Bay. Formerly their territories had extended westwards at least as far as the Uda river and the Shantar Islands until pushed out by the Manchus and, later, the Russians.

The earliest mention of the Nivkh in history is believed to be a 12th-century Chinese chronicle, referring to a people called Jílièmí (Chinese: 吉列迷), who were in contact with the Mongol rulers of Yuan China. They had been allied with the Mongols since 1263, and the Mongols invaded Sakhalin to aid the Nivkh against the Ainu, who had been encroaching on Sakhalin from Hokkaido.

After the Yuan period, Ainu and Nivkh of Sakhalin became tributaries to the Ming dynasty of China after Manchuria came under Ming rule as part of the Nurgan Regional Military Commission. Boluohe, Nanghar and Wuliehe were Yuan posts set up to receive tribute from the Ainu after their war with the Yuan ended in 1308. Ming Chinese outposts in Sakhalin and the Amur river area received animal skin tribute from Ainu on Sakhalin, Uilta and Nivkh in the 15th century after the Tyr-based Yongning Temple was set up along with the Nurkan (Nurgan) outposts by the Yongle emperor in 1409.

The Ming also held the post at Wuliehe and received marten pelt fur tribute from assistant commander Alige in 1431 from Sakhalin after the Ming assigned titles like weizhenfu (official charged with subjugation), zhihui qianshi (assistance commander), zhihui tongzhi (vice commander) and Zhihuishi (commander) to Sakhalin Indigenous headmen. The Ming received tribute from the headmen of Alingge, Tuolingha, Sanchiha and Zhaluha in 1437.

The position of headman among Sakhalin Indigenous peoples was inherited paternally from father to son and the sons came with their fathers to Wuliehe. Ming officials gave silk uniforms with the appropriate rank to the Sakhalin Ainu, Uilta and Nivkh after they paid tribute. The Maritime Province region had the Ming "system for subjugated peoples' implementers in it for the Sakhalin Indigenous peoples. Sakhalin received iron tools from mainland Asia through this trade, as Tungus groups joined in from 1456-1487. Local Indigenous hierarchies had Ming Chinese given political offices integrated with them. The Ming system on Sakhalin was imitated by the Qing.

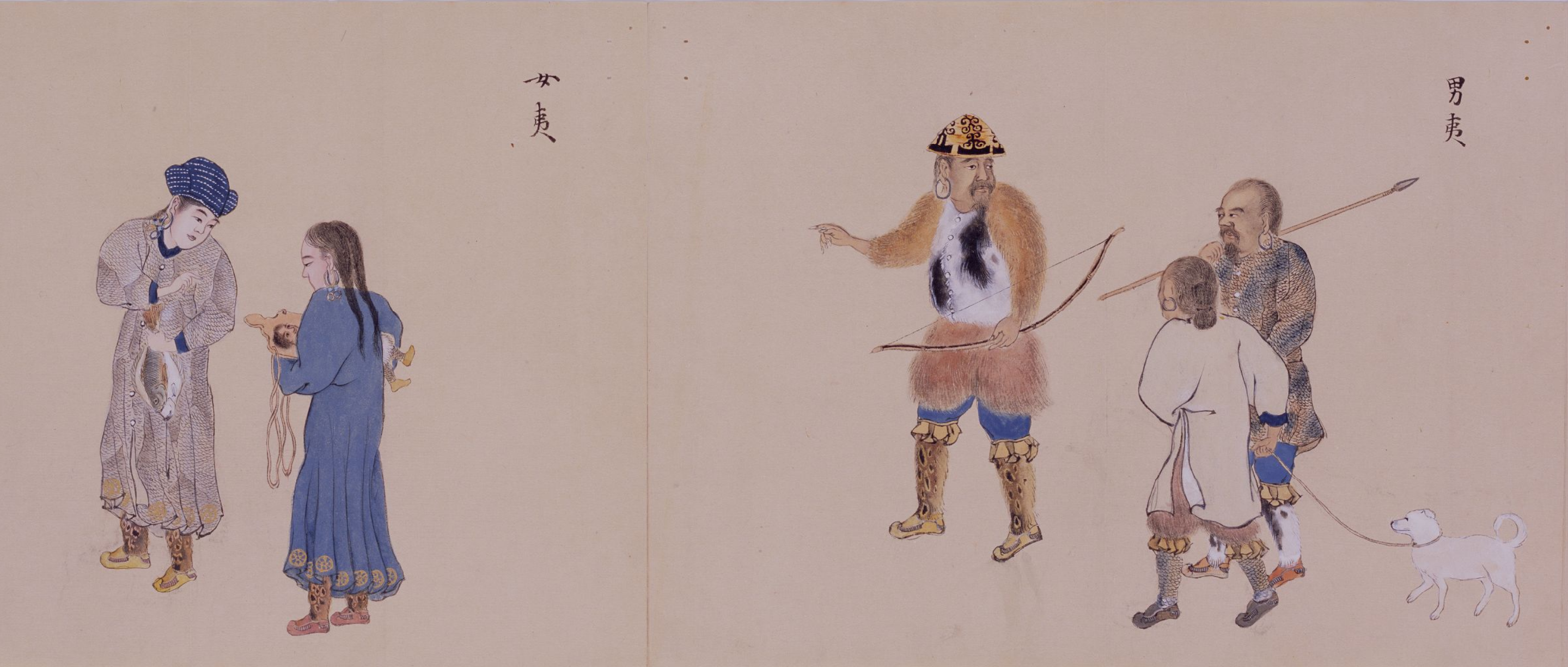
Nivkh men and women, c. 1810

Nivkh women in Sakhalin married Han Chinese Ming officials when the Ming took tribute from Sakhalin and the Amur river region. Local Sakhalin native chiefs had their daughters taken as wives by Manchu officials, as sanctioned by the Qing dynasty when the Qing exercised jurisdiction in Sakhalin and took tribute from them.

Due to Ming rule in Manchuria, Chinese cultural and religious influence such as Chinese New Year, the "Chinese god", Chinese motifs like the dragon, spirals, scrolls, and material goods like agriculture, husbandry, heating, iron cooking pots, silk, and cotton spread among the Amur natives like the Udeghes, Ulchis, and Nanais.

=== Tsarist Russia and Imperial Japan ===
In 1643, Vassili Poyarkov was the first Russian to write of the Nivkh, calling them Gilyak, a Tungus exonym, by which they would be referred until the 1920s.

For many centuries, the Nivkh were tributaries of the Manchus. After the Treaty of Nerchinsk in 1689, they functioned as intermediaries between the Russians, Manchu and Japanese, and also the Ainu, who were vassals of the Japanese. Early contact with the southern Sakhalin Ainu was generally hostile, although trade between the two was apparent.

The Nivkh suffered severely from the Cossack conquest and imposition of Tsarist Russians; they called the latter kinrsh (devils). The Russian Empire gained complete control over Nivkh lands after the 1858 Treaty of Aigun and the 1860 Convention of Peking. The Russians established a penal colony (katorga) on Sakhalin, which operated from 1857 to 1906. They transported numerous Russian criminal and political exiles there, including Lev Sternberg, an important early ethnographer of the Nivkh. The Nivkh were soon outnumbered; they were sometimes employed as prison guards and to track escaped convicts. The Nivkh suffered epidemics of smallpox, plague, and influenza, brought by the immigrants and spread in the crowded, unsanitary prison environment.

The Empire of Japan and Russia jointly ruled the island as part of the 1855 Treaty of Shimoda. From the 1875 Treaty of Saint Petersburg until the 1905 Treaty of Portsmouth, Russia governed all of Sakhalin. From 1905 to 1945, Sakhalin was partitioned between Russia and Japan along the 50th parallel north, with an interlude from 1920 to 1925 which would see the northern half occupied by Japan.

Russia allowed Japanese entrepreneur fishermen in Nivkh lands from the 1880s until 1948. The Russian Priamur governor-generalship had difficulty finding Russian labour and allowed Japanese and Nivkh fishermen to develop the area, though they were heavily taxed. Russian authorities prevented the Nivkh from fishing in prior coastal and river systems via bans and high taxes from cached fish. The first of many incidents of over-exploitation of fisheries by the Japanese (and later the Russians) on the Tartar Strait and lower Amur occurred in 1898. It drove many Nivkhs into starvation if they could not import expensive Russian foods.

There were 113 Nivkh in Japanese-controlled territory in 1932.

=== Under Soviet rule ===
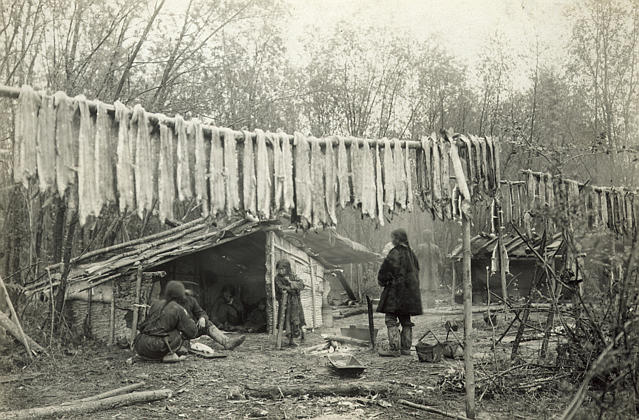
A Nivkh village in the early 20th century

Russia underwent the October Revolution forming the Soviet Union in 1922. The new government altered prior Russian Imperial policies towards the Nivkh that were in line with communist ideology. Soviet officials embraced the autonym Nivkh to replace the old term Gilyak, as a hallmark for new native self-determination. A brief autonomous okrug was created for the Nivkh. The government granted them extensive fishing rights, which were not rescinded until the 1960s.

Other Soviet policies proved devastating. The Nivkh were forced into mass agricultural and industrial labour collectives called kolkhoz. Nivkh fishermen were difficult to convert to agricultural practices because of their belief that ploughing the earth was a sin. The Nivkh were soon working and living as a second-class minority group among the massive Russian labour force. In the 1930s, Nivkh people would often be subject to disappearances under suspicion of Pro-Japanese sentiments.

These collectives irrevocably altered the lifestyle of the Nivkh. The traditional hunter-gatherer lifestyle disappeared. Soviet authorities showcased the Nivkh as a 'model' nation for a culture quickly transforming from the Neolithic to a socialist industrial model. They banned the use of the Nivkh language from schools and the public square. The Russian language was mandated and Russification of the Nivkh accelerated. Many Nivkh stories, beliefs, and clan ties were forgotten by new generations.

From 1945 to 1948, many Nivkh, as well as half of the Oroks and all of the Sakhalin Ainu, who had been living under Japanese jurisdiction in the southern half of Sakhalin, were forced to move to Japan along with the ethnic Japanese settlers. Many indigenous people would later return to the area. According to "Modern Ainu: The Romance of Ethnic Migration" (現代のアイヌ : 民族移動のロマン, by Kosuge Sugawara, 1966 under Genbunsha), these Nivkh people in Japan resided in Abashiri, Hakodate, and Sapporo. One notable displaced Nivkh from Karafuto to Abashiri was Chiyo Nakamura (1906–1969), a shaman from Poronaisk (Japanese: 敷香町, romanized: Shisuka-machi). By 2004, the Nivkh-Orok community in Abashiri had apparently vanished.

Chuner Taksami, an anthropologist, is considered the first modern Nivkh literary figure and supporter of Siberian rights. In the post-Soviet Russian commonwealth of nations, the Nivkh have fared better than the Ainu or the Itelmens, but worse than the Chukchi or the Tuvans. The Soviet government in 1962 resettled many of the Nivkh into fewer, denser settlements, such that Sakhalin settlements had been reduced from 82 to 13 by 1986. This relocation was accomplished via the Soviet collectives that the Nivkh had become so dependent on. The closure of state-funded amenities such as a school or electricity generator prompted citizenry to move into government-preferred settlements.

=== After the Soviet collapse ===
With the collapse of the Soviet Union in 1991, the kolkhoz collectives were abandoned. The Nivkh were dependent on the state-funded collectives, and with their dissolution, rapid economic hardship ensued for the already impoverished populace. At present, the Nivkh living in the north of Sakhalin see their future threatened by the giant offshore oil extraction projects known as Sakhalin-I and Sakhalin-II. Since January 2005, the Nivkh, led by their elected leader Alexey Limanzo, have engaged in non-violent protest actions, demanding an independent ethnological assessment of Shell's and Exxon's plans. Solidarity actions have been staged in Moscow, New York City and later in Berlin. The monthly Nivkh newspaper, Nivkh Dif, established in 1990, is published in the West-Sakhalin dialect and is headquartered in the village of Nekrasovka.

== Society ==
A group of Nivkh people using dog sleds in northern Sakhalin c. 1924

=== Village life ===
The Nivkh were semi-sedentary hunter-gatherers with summer and winter settlements. Nivkh villages consisted of three to four households shared by several families with larger villages rare, and mostly located on the Amur estuary. Households were shared for reasons of community and survival during the harsh cold winters. Villages would last for several decades but were susceptible to floods and sometimes vanished. Many were wiped out during the devastating Amur floods of 1915 and 1968. Often households contained families that were not related. The village was usually composed of people from two to eight different clans, four being standard.

In the late fall, able-bodied Nivkh men would leave the villages to hunt for game in the surrounding hunting grounds whereas women would gather foods from the forests. Nivkh would move to winter settlements near rivers to survive the harsh snows and catch salmon spawning (see list of Nivkh settlements). The Nivkh were very hospitable, such that the Nanai located upstream on the Amur when faced with hard times would often visit or stay in Nivkh villages.

=== Clan ===
Nivkh clans (khal) were a group of people united by marriage ties, a common derived deity, arranging marriages, and responsible for group dispute resolution. The clan is divided into three exogamous sub-clans. A clan would cooperate with other members on hunts and fishing when away from the village. A Nivkh clan believed they had "one (common) akhmalk or imgi, one fire, one mountain man, one bear, one devil, one tkhusind (ransom, or clan penalty), and one sin."

=== Marriage ===
Marriage tended to be exogamic unlike many paleo-Siberian groups. Although within the clan, marriage is endogamic, while sub-clans are exogamic. They have a triangulated system of marital exchange based on a tri-clan phratry or alliance group (pandf), that according to Lev Sternberg was very similar to the Punaluan marriage. Any Nivkhi men have sexual access to women their own generation in the wife-giving lineage and vice-versa. Nivkh marriage customs were very complicated and controlled by the clan.

Cross-cousin marriage seems to be the original custom with the clan, a latter necessity when the clan was unable to marry individuals without breaking taboo. The bride price was probably introduced by the Neo-Siberians. The dowry was shared by the clan. The number of men generally exceeded the number of women. It was hard to gain wives, as they were few and expensive. This led to the wealthier men having more than one wife and poor men being unable to obtain wives.

== Religion ==
Nivkh traditional religion was based on animist beliefs, especially via shamanism, before colonial Russians made efforts to convert the population to Eastern Orthodox Christianity. Nivkh animists believe the island of Sakhalin is a giant beast lying on its belly with the trees of the island as its hair. When the beast is upset, it awakens and trembles the earth causing earthquakes. Nivkh have a pantheon of vaguely defined gods (yz, yzng) that presided over the mountains, rivers, seas and sky.

Nivkhs have extensive folklore, songs, and mythos of how humans and the universe were created, and of how fantastic heroes, spirits and beasts battled with each other in ancient times. Some Nivkhs have converted to Russian Orthodoxy or other religions, though many still practice traditional beliefs. Fire is especially venerated. It is the symbol of the unity of the clan. Fire is considered a deity of their ancestors, protecting them from evil spirits and guarding their clan from harm. An open flame would be "fed" a leaf of tobacco, spices, or a tipple of vodka in order to please the spirits for protection. Nivkhs would also frequently offer items to the deities by 'feeding'. The sea would be "fed" an item of importance in order that the sea god protects the travellers.

=== Shamanism ===
Shamans' (ch'am) main role was in diagnosing and curing disease for the Nivkh. The rare shamans typically wore an elaborate coats with belts often made of metal. Remedies composed of plant and sometimes animal matter were employed to cure sickness. Talismans were used or offered to patients to prevent sickness. Shamans additionally functioned as a conduit to combat and ward off evil spirits that cause death. A shaman's services usually were compensated with goods, quarters and food.

=== Bear Festival ===
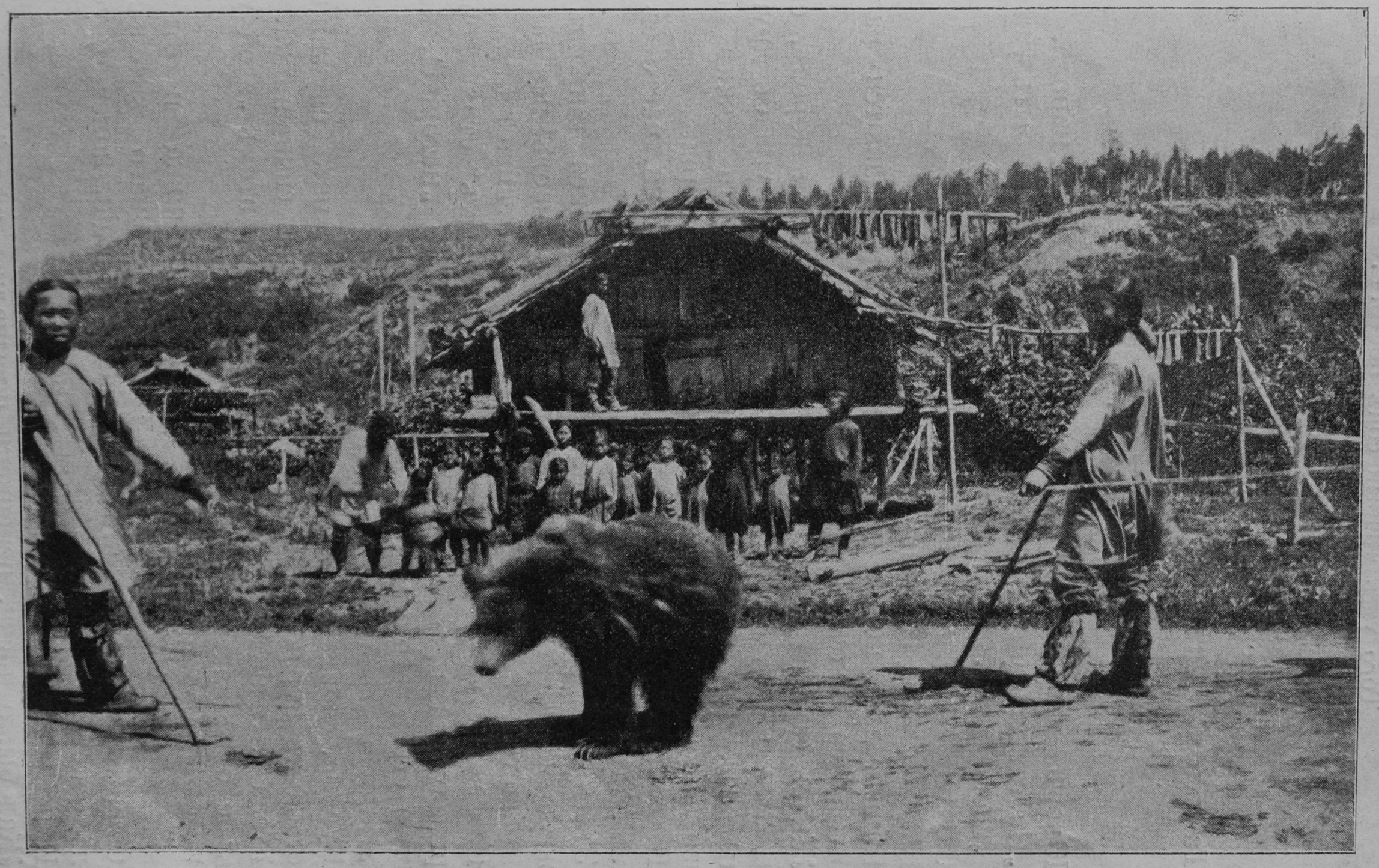
A bear festival by Nivkh around 1903

Nivkh Shamans also presided over the Bear Festival, a traditional holiday celebrated between January and February depending on the clan. Bears were captured and raised in a corral for several years by local women, who treated the bear like a child. The bear was considered a sacred earthly manifestation of Nivkh ancestors and the gods in bear form (see Bear worship). During the festival, the bear would be dressed in a specially-made ceremonial costume. It would be offered a banquet to take back to the realm of gods to show benevolence upon the clans.

After the banquet, the bear would be sacrificed and eaten in an elaborate religious ceremony. Dogs were often sacrificed as well. The bear's spirit returned to the gods of the mountain 'happy' and would then reward the Nivkh with bountiful forests. The festival typically would be arranged by relatives to honour the death of a kinsman.

Generally, the Bear Festival was an inter-clan ceremony where a clan of wife-takers restored ties with a clan of wife-givers upon the broken link of the kinsman's death. The Bear Festival was suppressed during Soviet occupation though the festival has had a modest revival since the decline of Soviet Union, albeit as a cultural instead of religious ceremony.

A very similar ceremony, Iomante, is practiced by the Ainu people of Japan.

== Environment ==
The Russian Far East has a cold and harsh climate. In the fish-rich Amur River estuary in the districts of Nixhne-Amruskii and Takhtinskii, winters have high winds and heavy snows with mid-winter usually averaging from −28 to −20 °C (−18 to −4 °F). Summers are wet and moderately warm ranging between 16 and 20 °C (61 and 68 °F). The area's biome is characterized as Taiga and evergreen coniferous forests consisting of larch, yew, birch, maple, lilac, honeysuckle, and extensive low-lying swamp grasses. Higher elevations have spruce, fir, ash, lime, walnut and mountain tops have cedar and lichens. Bears, foxes, sables, hares, Siberian tigers, elks, grouse, and deer typical near the Amur outlet which usually floods during the rainy season.

Northern Sakhalin is harsher ecologically with mostly Taiga. Winters are longer, with a mean temperature of −19 °C (−2 °F), however, short summers are warmer averaging 15 °C (59 °F) due to warmer Pacific Ocean currents moving around the island. Heavy snows blanket the island of Sakhalin (Gilyak: Yh-mif) during winter, due to monsoon winds blowing from Siberia, drawing humidity as they pass over the Sea of Okhotsk, Sea of Japan, and the Strait of Tartary. Barren tundra dominates the north, with sparse trees such as larch, birch and various grasses, while moving southward, spruce and fir are seen. Bears, foxes, otters, lynx, and reindeer are common wildlife. The Island's major rivers are the Tym' and Poronai, rich in fish, especially salmon. Before Russian colonization, Nivkh villages could be found on these rivers approximately every 5 km.

The Strait of Tartary is currently only 20 kilometers (12 mi) wide and is shallow enough that an ice bridge forms during the winter that can be traversed by foot or dog-sledge. At the glacial maximum of the Ice Age, sea levels were 100 meters (330 ft) lower than they are today. The Eurasia continent was connected to Sakhalin via the Strait of Tatar and Hokkaidō via the Soya Strait of which humans migrated. This connection explains the similarities of trees, plants, and animals including now-extinct mammoths. The receding ice age warmed the area, allowing greater tree cover and wildlife, thus new resources for the Nivkhs to exploit. The opening of the Soya and then the shallower Strait of Tartary allowed warm pacific currents to bathe the island and the lower Amur River.

== Technology ==
=== Dwellings ===
Nivkhs lived in two types of self-built winter dwellings. The most ancient of these was the ryv (or to). The dwelling was a round dugout about 7.5 meters (23 feet) in diameter, shored up by wooden poles and covered with packed dirt and grass. The ryv had a fireplace in the centre and a smoke hole for light and smoke escape. The other type of dwelling used for winter is the chad ryv similar to the Nanai dio which was modelled after Manchurian and Chinese dwellings of the Amur. The chad ryv were one-room structures with a gable roof and a kang (Chinese furnace) for heating. A nearby shed held sledges, skis, boats, and dogs.

=== Clothing ===
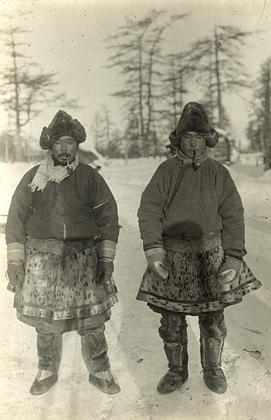
Nivkh men who wear skiy and kosk

Nivkhs traditionally wore robes (skiy for men, hukht for women) having three buttons, fastened on the left side of the body. Winter garments were made of skins from fish, seal, sable, and furs from otter, lynx, fox, and dog. Women's hukht extended below the knee and were light multicoloured with intricate embroideries and various ornaments sewed on the sleeves, collar and hem. Ornaments were coins, bells, or beads made of wood, glass, or metal mostly originating from Manchurian and Chinese traders.

Men's skiy were darker coloured, shorter, and had pockets built into the sleeves. Men's clothing were less elaborate with ornaments on the sleeve and left lapel. Men would also wear a loose kilt called a kosk when hunting or travelling on dog-sledge.

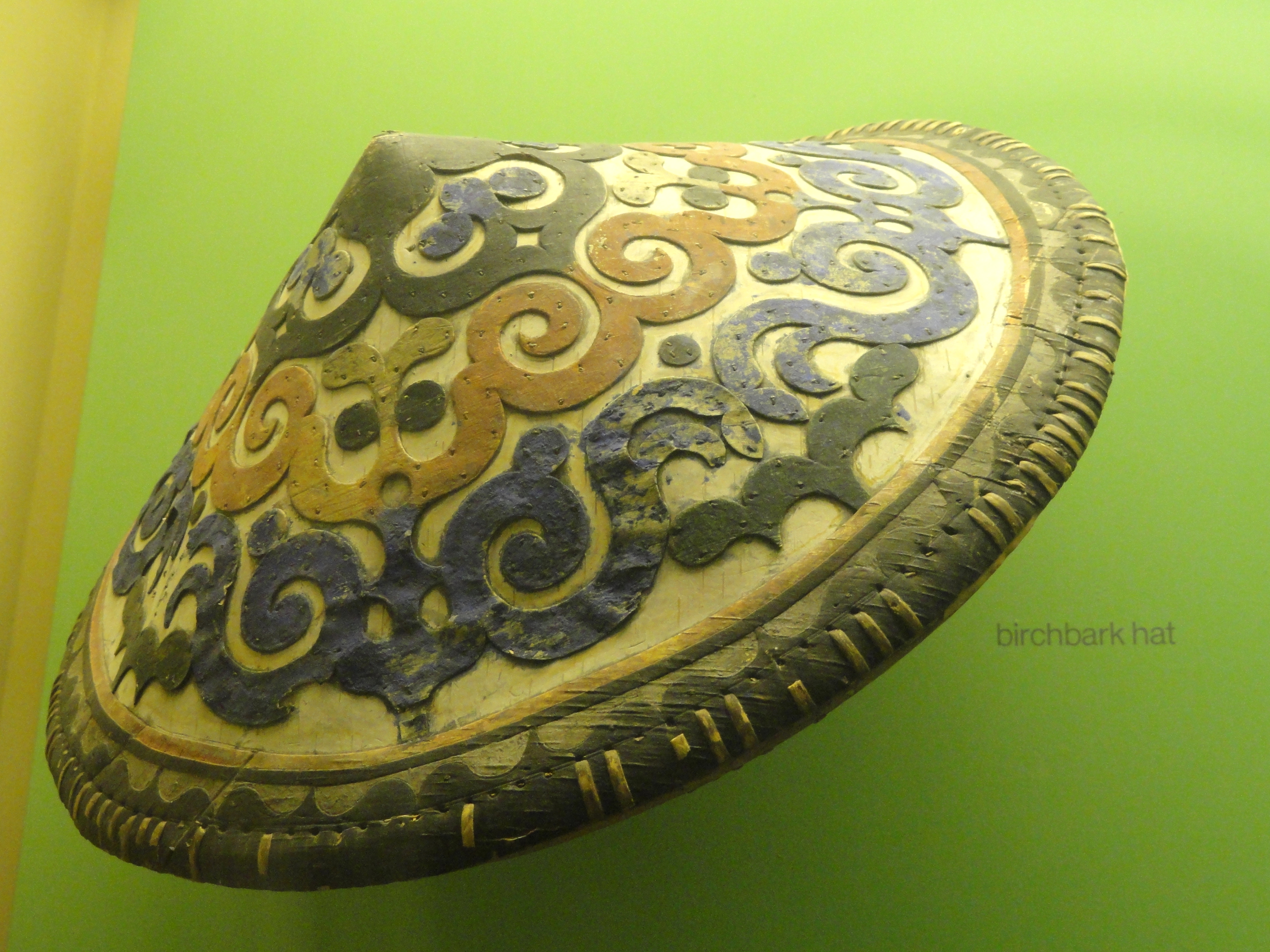
A Nivkh hiv hak

Boots were made of fish-, seal-, or deerskin, and very watertight. Fur hats (hak) were worn in winter, with the furry tails and ears of the animal often adorning the back and crown of the hat. Summer hats (hiv hak) were conical and made from birch-bark. Since Soviet collectivization, Nivkh mostly wear mass-produced Western clothing, but traditional clothing is worn for holidays and cultural events.

== Diet ==
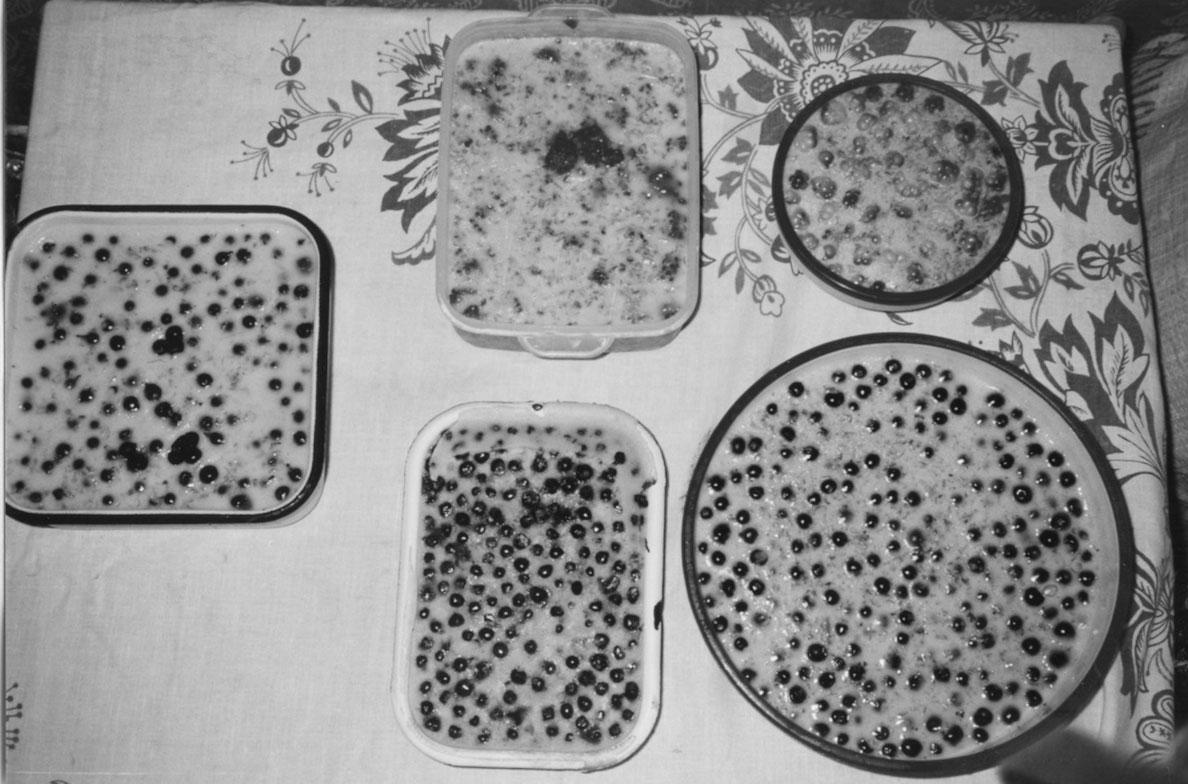
Mos, a traditional Nivkh dish

The Nivkh had a diverse diet, as they were semi-sedentary before colonization. Fish was the main source of food for the Nivkh, including pink, Pacific, and chum salmon as well as trout, red eye, burbot and pike found in rivers and streams. Saltwater fishing provided saffron cod, flatfish, and marine goby caught on the littoral coasts of the Strait of Tartary, Sea of Okhotsk, and the Pacific Ocean, though over fishing by Russian and Japanese trawlers has depleted many of these fish stocks.

Industrial pollution such as phenols and heavy metals in the Amur River have devastated fish stocks and damaged the soil of the estuaries. There is a traditional preservation process called yukola, involving slicing the fish in a particular way and drying the strips by hanging them in the frigid air, without salt. The preservation process created a lot of dried fish waste, unpalatable for human consumption but utilized for dog food. Pulverizing dried fish and mixing it with fish skins, water, seal fat, and berries until the mixture had a sour cream consistency is a favorite Nivkh dish called mos.

Nivkhs would hunt seal (larga, ringed, ribbon, sea lions), duck, sable, and otters. They would gather various berries, wild leeks, lily bulbs, and nuts. Contacts with the Chinese, Manchu, and Japanese from the 12th century on introduced new foods incorporated in the Nivkhs’ diet, such as salt, sugar, rice, millet, legumes and tea. Russian 19th-century colonisation introduced flour, bread, potatoes, vodka, tobacco, butter, canned vegetables and fruits, and other meats.

== Population genetics ==
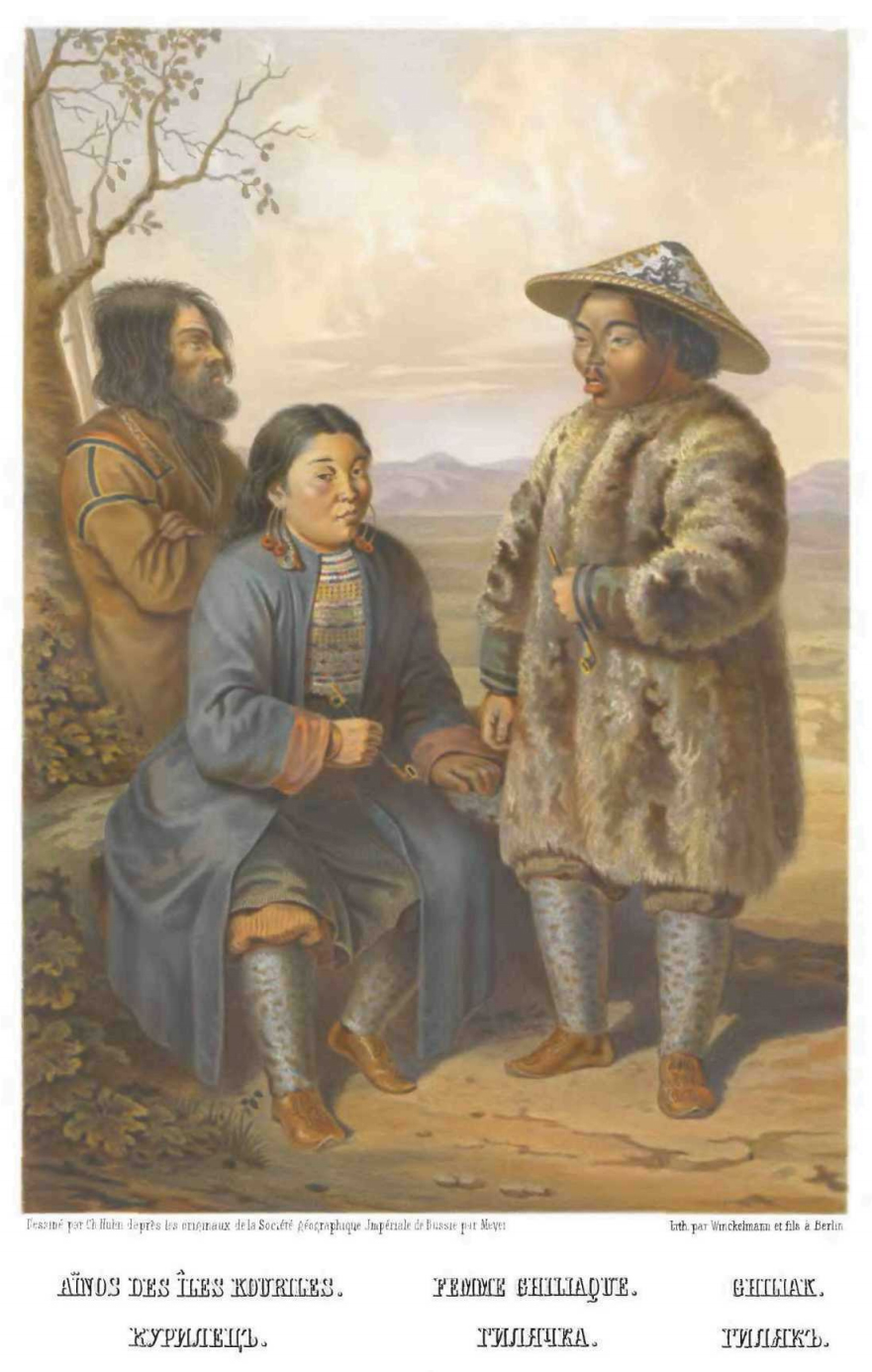
An 1862 illustration of an Ainu man (left) and a Nivkh couple (right)

=== Y-chromosomal DNA haplogroups ===
Lell et al. (2002) tested a sample of seventeen Nivkh males and found that six of them (35%) belonged to Haplogroup C-M48, six of them (35%) belonged to haplogroup P-M45 (xQ-M3, R-M17), two of them (12%) belonged to haplogroup C-M130 (xM48), two of them (12%) belonged to haplogroup K-M9 (xO-M119, O-M122, N-Tat, P-M45), and one of them (6%) belonged to haplogroup O-M119.

Tajima et al. (2004) tested a sample of twenty-one Nivkh males and found that eight of them (38%) belonged to haplogroup C-M217, a haplogroup which is also common among Koryaks, Itelmens, Yukaghirs, Tungusic peoples, and Mongols; six (29%) belonged to haplogroup K-M9 (xO-M122, O-M119, P-P27), four of them (19%) belonged to haplogroup P-P27 (xR-SRY10831.2), two of them (9.5%) belonged to R-SRY10831.2, and one of them (4.8%) belonged to Haplogroup BT-SRY10831.1 (xC-RPS4Y711, DE-YAP, K-M9).

According to the abstract for a doctoral dissertation by Vladimir Nikolaevich Kharkov, a sample of 52 Nivkhs from Sakhalin Oblast contained the following Y-DNA haplogroups: 71% (37/52) C-M217 (xC-M77/M86, C-M407), 7.7% (4/52) O-M324 (xO-M134), 7.7% (4/52) Q-M242 (xQ-M346), 5.8% (3/52) D-M174, 3.8% (2/52) O-M175 (xO-P31, O-M122), 1.9% (1/52) O-P31, and 1.9% (1/52) N-M46/M178.

Kharkov et al. (2024) examined the Y-chromosome haplogroups of 37 Nivkh males in the Okhinsky District of Sakhalin Oblast, who were estimated to have no paternal admixture with other ethnic groups. The results showed that 43.2% (16/37) belonged to haplogroup C2a1a2b-B90, 32.4% (12/37) to C2a1a1b1a-F13958, 10.8% (4/37) to C2a1-ACT1942, 8.1% (3/37) to Q1a1a1-M120, and 5.4% (2/37) to O2a1b1a2a-F238.

=== Mitochondrial DNA haplogroups ===
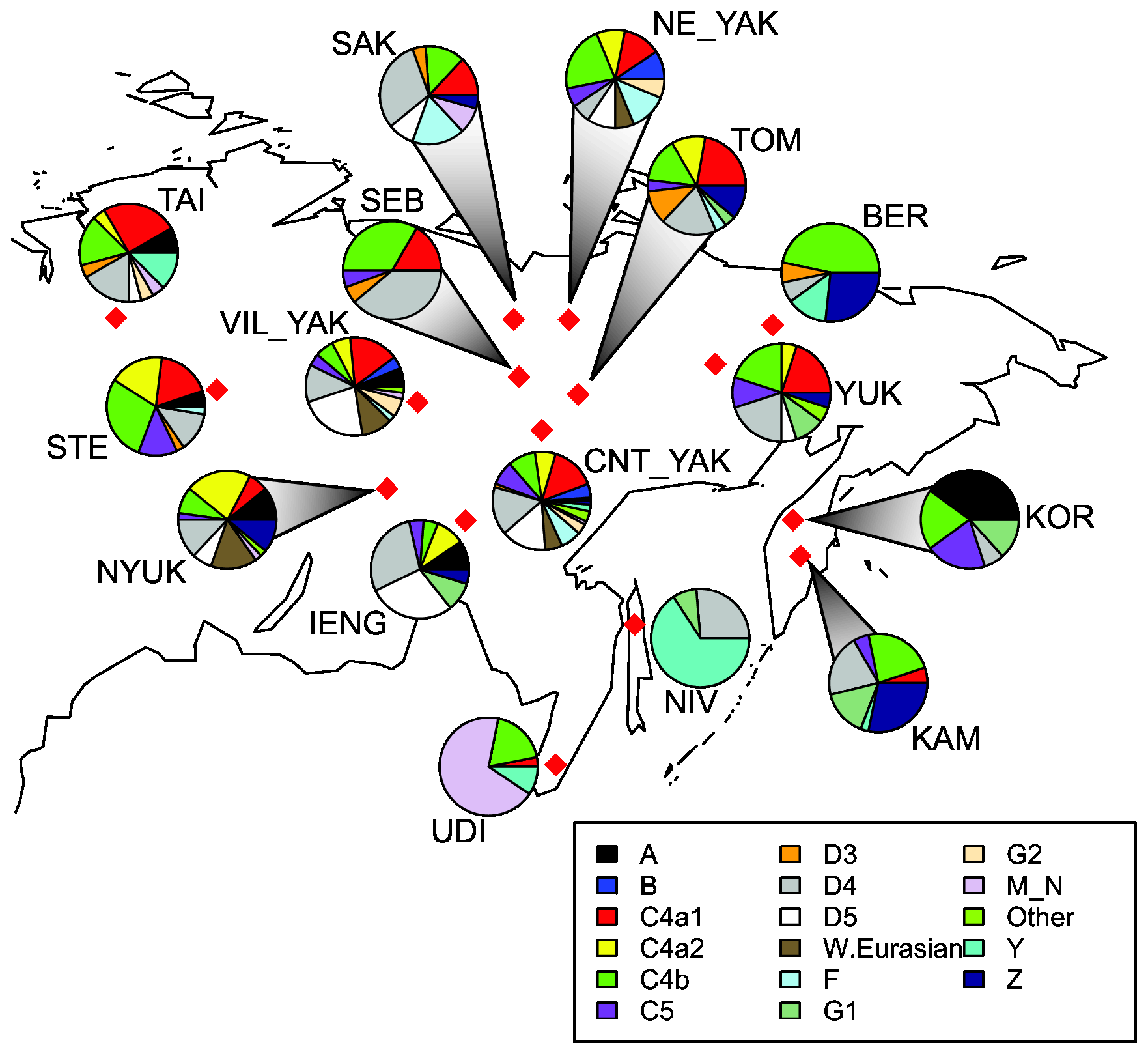
Mitochondrial DNA study of Siberian peoples. The Nivkh (labelled NIV) can be seen to not be related to the other people.

Torroni et al. (1993) reported collecting blood samples from 57 "unrelated and unhybridized Nivkh individuals living in Rybnovsk and Nekrasovka villages in northern Sakhalin Island." According to Starikovskaya et al. (2005) and Bermisheva et al. (2005), the members of this sample of Nivkhs belong to haplogroup Y (37/57 = 64.9%), haplogroup D (16/57 = 28.1%), haplogroup G1 (3/57 = 5.3%), and haplogroup M (xC, Z, D, G) (1/57 = 1.8%).

In another sample of Nivkhs, possibly "those living on the continent" (although there appears to be an error in the original text), Bermisheva et al. (2005) have found the following mtDNA haplogroups: 67.3% (37/55) haplogroup Y, 25.5% (14/55) haplogroup G, 3.6% (2/55) haplogroup D, 1.8% (1/55) haplogroup M (xC, Z, D, G), and 1.8% (1/55) haplogroup N or R (xA, B, F, Y).

According to Duggan et al. (2013), the members of a sample of 38 Nivkhs collected in northern Sakhalin belonged to haplogroup Y1a (25/38 = 65.8%), haplogroup D4m2 (10/38 = 26.3%), and haplogroup G1b (3/38 = 7.9%). One identical Y1a haplotype was shared by eight Nivkh individuals, another Y1a haplotype was shared by six Nivkh individuals, and two other Y1a haplotypes were shared by three Nivkh individuals each, indicating a low genetic diversity of this population. Likewise, one identical D4m2 haplotype was shared by four Nivkh individuals, another D4m2 haplotype was shared by two Nivkh individuals, and a third D4m2 haplotype was shared by two or three Nivkh individuals and a Northeast Yakut individual.

The authors also have found Haplogroup Y1a in 13.3% (2/15) of Berezovka Evens, 12.5% (3/24) of Taimyr Evenks, 6.5% (2/31) of Udegeys, 2.6% (1/39) of Kamchatka Evens, and 2.3% (2/88) of Central Yakuts, and they have noted that other studies have reported finding this haplogroup in high frequency in the Ulchi and Negidal, in 9%-10% of Koryaks and eastern Evenks, as well as in low frequency in Central and Vilyuy Yakuts. Besides the Nivkhs, the authors also have found mtDNA that belongs to haplogroup D4m2 in 8.7% (2/23) Sakkyryyr Evens, 3.7% (1/27) Tompo Evens, and 3.1% (1/32) Northeast Yakuts, with the Northeast Yakut individual sharing an identical haplotype with several of the Nivkhs. The authors have noted that mtDNA sequences that belong to the same branch of haplogroup D have been found in Evenks, Evens, Yukaghirs, and South Siberian Buryats and Turkic speakers, and another study has reported one instance of D4m2 in a sample of 154 Dolgans.

As for G1b, the other mtDNA haplogroup found among Nivkhs, Duggan et al. (2013) also have found it in their samples of Kamchatka Evens (6/39 = 15.4%), Koryaks (2/15 = 13.3%), Yukaghirs (2/20 = 10.0%), Iengra Evenks (2/21 = 9.5%), and Tompo Evens (1/27 = 3.7%), and they have cited Starikovskaya et al. (2005) as evidence for their statement that haplogroup G1 is also common in the Negidal. According to YFull and Dryomov et al. (2020), two members of haplogroup G1b from the Nivkh sample of Duggan et al. (2013) belong to G1b-G16129A!*, whereas the remaining member of haplogroup G1b from that sample belongs to G1b1a-G16244A.

М. А. Gubina et al. (2013) examined the mitochondrial DNA of a sample of seventeen Nivkhs from the village of Nogliki, Nogliksky District, Sakhalin Oblast and found that they belonged to haplogroup Y (8/17 = 47.1%, all Y1a+T16189C!), haplogroup D (3/17 = 17.6%, including 2/17 D4e5b and 1/17 D4j4a), haplogroup G (3/17 = 17.6%, including 2/17 G1b1-16207 and 1/17 G1b1a-16244), haplogroup H (2/17 = 11.8%), and haplogroup U5 (1/17 = 5.9%). Besides the Western Eurasian influence apparent in the presence of haplogroups H and U5 among Nivkhs of Nogliki, it is also notable that there is no overlap between the Nivkh samples of Duggan et al. (2013) and Gubina et al. (2013) in regard to the subclades of haplogroups D4 and G1b to which they belong except for a single member of G1b1a-G16244A in each sample.

== Notable Nivkhs ==
- Chiyo Nakamura (1906–1969), Japanese Nivkh writer
- Chuner Taksami (1931–2014), Russian Nivkh ethnographer
- Vladimir Sangi (b. 1935), Russian Nivkh writer, publicist
- Alexey Limanzo, President of the Association of Indigenous Peoples of North Sakhalin Region
- Marina Temina, Nivkh teacher

== See also ==
- List of Nivkh settlements
- Nivkh mythology
- Sakhalin
- Ainu people
- Chukchi people
- Itelmen
- Koryaks
