= Vladimir Sangi =

Nivkh writer and publicist from Sakhalin, Russia

Vladimir Mikhailovich Sangi
- Владимир Михайлович Санги
- Born: 18 March 1935 (age 91); Nabil, Russian SFSR, Soviet Union
- Citizenship: Russia
- Education: Herzen University
- Writing career
- Period: 1961–
- Genre: Prose
- Notable awards: Maxim Gorky RSFSR State Prize

Vladimir Mikhailovich Sangi (Russian: Влади́мир Миха́йлович Санги́, IPA: [vlɐˈdʲimʲɪr mʲɪˈxajləvʲɪtɕ sɐnˈɡʲi]; 18 March 1935) is a Nivkh writer and publicist from Sakhalin, Russia. He writes in Nivkh and Russian.

== Biography ==
Sangi was born 18 March 1935 in the nomadic settlement Nabil (now a village in Sakhalin Oblast). He graduated from Herzen University in 1959 and became a member of the Union of Soviet Writers in 1962. In 1965 he completed advanced literature courses. In 1967 he joined the Communist Party of the Soviet Union.

Sangi settled in Moscow in the mid-1960s, and since 1975 has been a chairman of the Union of Russian Writers. After perestroika he moved back to Sakhalin, where in 1993 he was elected chief of the tribes of Ket Eastern Sakhalin and the basin of the Tym River. He is also a member of the International League for Human Rights under the United Nations Economic and Social Council.

A speaker of the East Sakhalin dialect of Nivkh, Sangi is the founder of Nivkh literature, one of the creators of the reformed Nivkh alphabet (introduced by an act of the Council of Ministers of the Soviet Union on 29 June 1979), and the author of the rules of Nivkh orthography, a Nivkh language primer, a Nivkh language textbook, textbooks for Nivkh schools, and books for reading in Nivkh, as well as a publisher of Nivkh translations of Russian classics.

In his work it's clear that a connection is preserved in myths between man and nature, the world of animals and the spiritual forces that define material existence.

A roundtable discussion at the UNESCO headquarters in Paris on 18 March 2015 entitled "Protection and Promotion of the Cultural and Linguistic Heritage of the Indigenous Peoples of Northern Sakhalin (Nivkhs)" was timed to coincide with Vladimir Sangi's eightieth birthday. The event proceeded under the auspices of the Commission of the Russian Federation for UNESCO. It was organized by Sakhalin Energy, the government of Sakhalin Oblast, and the Permanent Delegation of the Russian Federation to UNESCO.

In 2024 Sangi released a collection of Nivkh legends titled Why Are There So Few People on Earth? (Nivkh: Янгур̌ ӈа мен миф ниғвӈгир̌ авлид), including translations to Russian, Sakha, English, Korean, and Japanese alongside the original Nivkh. An audiobook includes the Nivkh and Russian texts.

== Works ==
- Нивхские легенды, 1961
- Солёные брызги, 1962
- Семипёрая птица, 1964, 1967
- Ложный гон, 1965, 1966
- Первый выстрел, 1965
- Легенды Ыхмифа, 1967, 1974
- Женитьба Кевонгов, 1975, 1977
- Месяц рунного хода, 1985
- Путешествие в стойбище Лунво, 1985
- Человек Ыхмифа, 1986
- Морская поэма, 1988
- Сын рыбы Тягмак, 1995
- Земля нивхов, 2005
- Эпос сахалинских нивхов, 2014
- Почему на земле людей мало, 2024

== Honours ==
- Maxim Gorky RSFSR State Prize (1988) — for his novel Путешествие в стойбище Лунво (1985)
- Order of the Badge of Honour (1977)
- Jubilee Medal "In Commemoration of the 100th Anniversary of the Birth of Vladimir Ilyich Lenin" (1970)
- Medal for Fidelity to the North (2009)
- Order of Friendship (2006)

== Anthologies ==
- Санги, В. М. (2000). Избранные произведения: В 2 томах. Vol. 1 (1000 экз ed.). Южно-Сахалинск: Сахалинское книжное издательство. ISBN 5-88-453-032-3.
- Санги, В. М. (2000). Избранные произведения: В 2 томах. Vol. 2 (1000 экз ed.). Южно-Сахалинск: Сахалинское книжное издательство. ISBN 5-88-453-032-3.
