= Yukola =

Dried fish and meat from Siberia

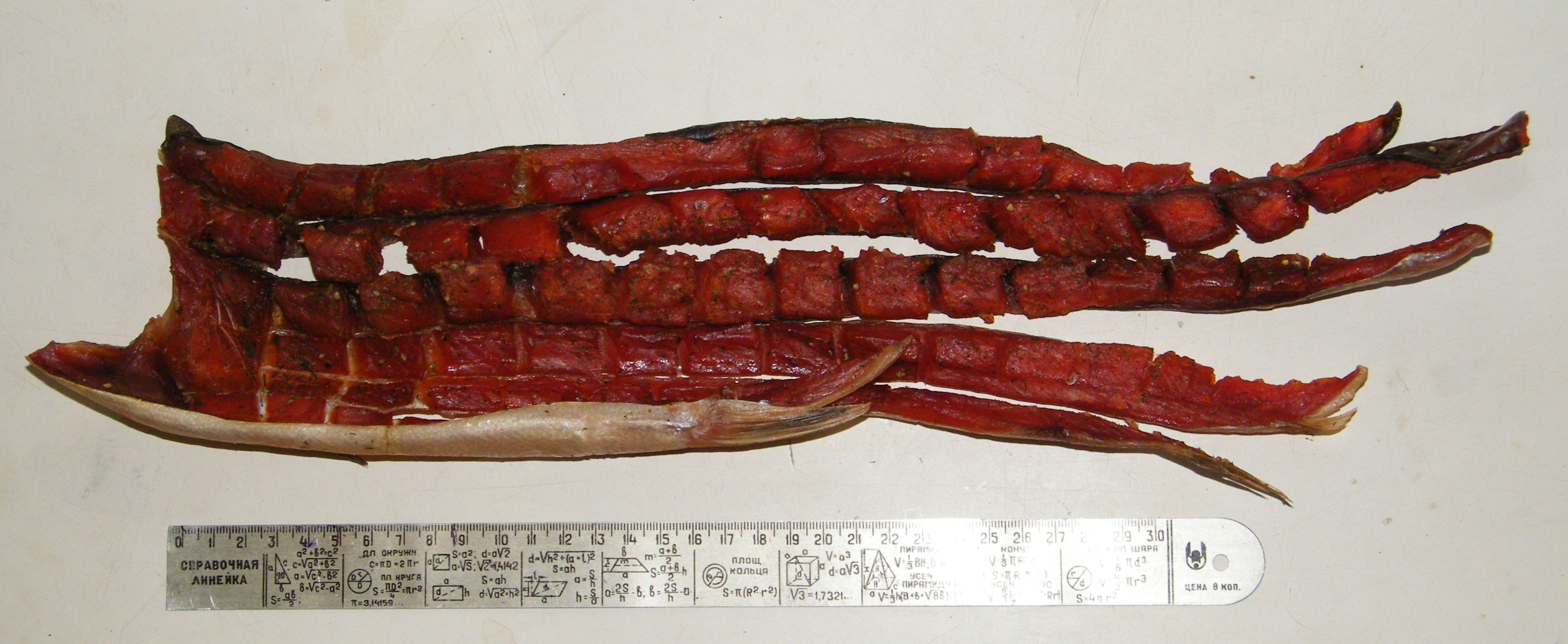
Chum salmon yukola

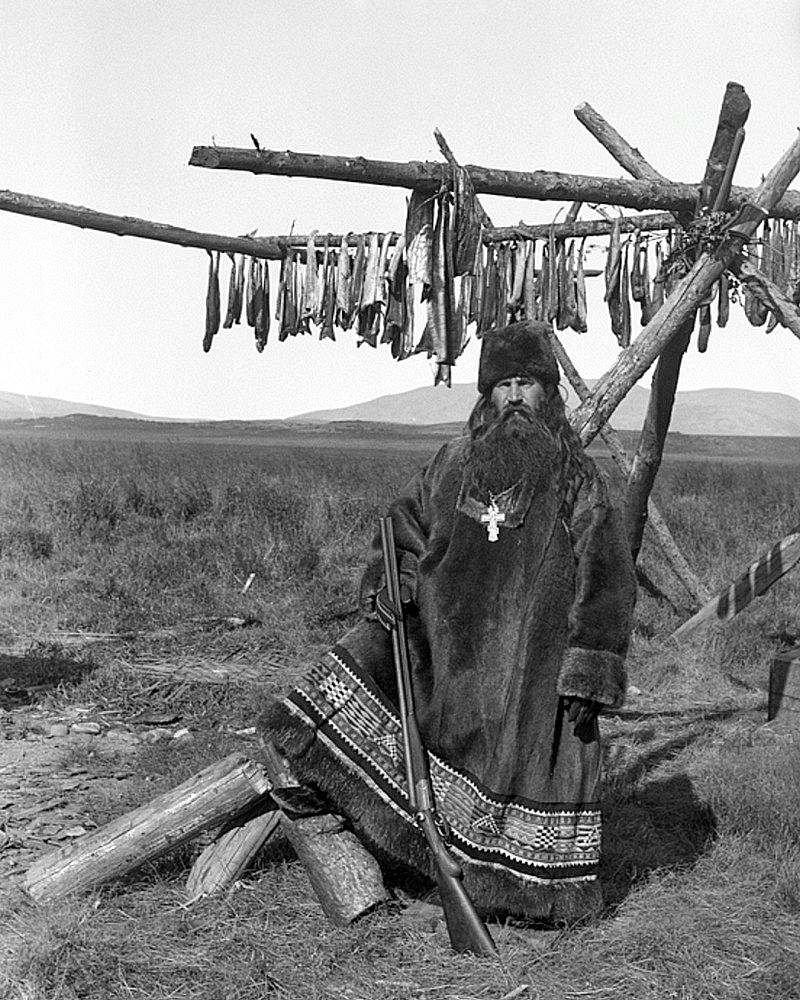
Yukola drying, 1901

Yukola (Russian: юкола, Nivkh: ма) is dried fish or a dried reindeer meat, a way of food preservation used by the peoples of Eastern Siberia and Russian Far East. Similarly to stockfish, youkola is prepared by drying under sun and wind. Mostly Salmonidae fish was used for yukola. It was used to feed people and sled dogs.

Victor Shnierelman describes fish preservation by Itelmens of Kamchatka as follows. There were two ways: yukola and fermented fish. The latter one was fish seasoned in pits. For yukola, fish was cut into three parts, two of which were edible flesh for humans, while the third one, which consisted of the head and spine, was used as "dog yukola". Dogs were fed with dog yukola while on travel and with soup from fermented fish at home.
