= Chuner Taksami =

Russian ethnographer

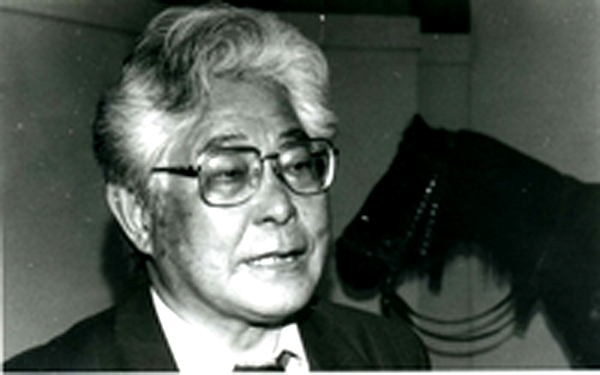
- Chuner Mikhailovich
- Born: 23 February 1931; Kalma, Khabarovsk Krai
- Died: 27 February 2014 (aged 83)
- Occupation: ethnographer
- Known for: Doctor of Historical Sciences attained in 1955

Chuner Mikhailovich Taksami (Russian: Чунер Михайлович Таксами; 23 February 1931 – 27 February 2014) was a Russian ethnographer of Nivkh origin and had a Doctor of Historical Sciences attained in 1955.

Taksami was born in Kalma, Khabarovsk Krai, Russian SFSR. He was a spokesman for the Nivkh and other Siberian peoples. Taksami specialized in Siberian historical, archeological, and anthropological research. He was the Director of Peter the Great Museum of Anthropology and Ethnography in St. Petersburg, Russia from 1997 to 2001. After his museum tenure was over Taksami collaborated with professors from Chiba University organizing ethnolinguistic expeditions to Nivkh settlements in the lower Amur River basin and on northern Sakhalin. He published over 300 works, including books, journals, dictionaries, and contemporary problems of Asian Northern Peoples mostly in Russian. Additionally he chaired or was a council member of various Siberian associations.

Preceded by Alexander Myl'nikov	Director of the Peter the Great Museum of Anthropology and Ethnography; 1997–2001	Succeeded by Yuri Chistov
