= Lev Sternberg =

Russian ethnographer (1861–1927)

Lev Yakovlevich Sternberg
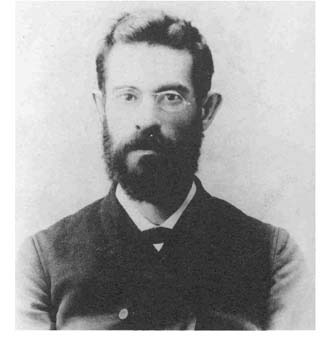
- Lev Sternberg
- Born: Chaim-Leib Yakovlevich Sternberg; May 3, 1861; Zhitomir, Russian Empire (Zhytomyr, Ukraine)
- Died: August 14, 1927 (aged 66); Dudergof, Soviet Union (Mozhaisky, Russia)
- Occupations: Ethnographer, Anthropologist

Lev (Chaim-Leib) Yakovlevich Sternberg (Russian: Лев (Хаим-Лейб) Я́ковлевич Ште́рнберг) (3 May [O.S. 21 April] 1861 – August 14, 1927) was a Russian and Soviet ethnographer of Jewish origin who from 1889 to 1897 studied the Nivkhs (Gilyaks), Oroks, and Ainu on Sakhalin and in Siberia for the American Museum of Natural History, in New York City.

== Biography ==
Sternberg majored in physics and mathematics at Saint Petersburg State University. He later majored in law at Novorossiisk University. He was an activist who joined Narodnaya Volya (The People's Will) and edited the publication Vestnik Narodnoi Voli (The Narodnaya Volya Herald). He was not a Marxist. He was arrested by Russian authorities April 27, 1886 for participation in The People's Will which was labeled an anti-tsarist terrorist organization spending three years in an Odessa jail. Sternberg was then exiled to the Sakhalin penal colony for a ten-year prison sentence. He was deported from Odessa on the boat Peterburg on March 19, 1889, arriving in Port Aleksandrovsk, Sakhalin, on May 19, 1889. Sternberg agitated authorities due to his activism with regard to prisoners' and indigenous peoples' rights. Authorities sent him to the remote community of Viakhtu, 100 km north of Port Aleksandrovsk, where he first began his ethnographic fieldwork on the Nivkhs, Oroks, and Ainu. He would return home but be put under house arrest for the first few years.

Lev Sternberg was an important Russian figure in the then new field of anthropology. Sternberg, with the help of Vladimir Bogoraz organized the first Russian ethnography center at Saint Petersburg State University after the 1917 Russian Revolution.
