= Nivkh languages =

Paleosiberian language family

Nivkh
- Gilyak, Amuric
- нивғгу диф, ниғвӈ дуғс
- Pronunciation: [ɲivɣgu ɟif] (Amur dialect); [ɲiɣvŋ duɣs] (E. Sakhalin dialect)
- Native to: Russian Far East, specifically Amur Oblast, Khabarovsk Krai, and Sakhalin Oblast
- Region: Island of Sakhalin, along the lower Amur River and around the Amur Liman. Formerly, also in the Shantar Islands and parts of Amur Oblast
- Ethnicity: 4,652 Nivkh
- Native speakers: 1,300 (2020 census)
- Language family: One of the world's primary language families
- Early form: Proto-Nivkh
- Dialects: Nivkh proper (Amur); East Sakhalin; North Sakhalin; South Sakhalin; Mishihase? †
- Writing system: Cyrillic, Latin

Language codes
- ISO 639-3: niv
- Glottolog: nivk1234
- ELP: Sakhalin Nivkh
- Settlements with Nivkh populations in the Russian Census of 2002

Nivkh (/ˈniːfk/ NEEFK; occasionally also Nivkhic; self-designation: Нивхгу диф, Nivhgu dif, /ɲivxɡu dif/), Gilyak (/ˈɡɪljæk/ GIL-yak), or Amuric, is a small language family, often portrayed as a language isolate, of two or three mutually unintelligible languages spoken by the Nivkh people in Outer Manchuria, in the basin of the Amgun (a tributary of the Amur), along the lower reaches of the Amur itself, and on the northern half of Sakhalin. "Gilyak" is the Russian rendering of terms derived from the Tungusic "Gileke" and Manchu-Chinese "Gilemi" (Gilimi, Gilyami) for culturally similar peoples of the Amur River region, and was applied principally to the Nivkh in Western literature.

The population of ethnic Nivkhs has been reasonably stable over the past century, with 4,549 Nivkhs counted in 1897 and 4,673 in 1989. However, the number of native speakers of the Nivkh language among these dropped from 100% to 23.3% in the same period, so by the 1989 census there were only 1,079 first-language speakers left. That may have been an overcount, however, as the 2010 census recorded only 198 native speakers, less than 4% of the ethnic population.

Proto-Nivkh(ic), the proto-language ancestral to the modern-day languages, has been reconstructed by Fortescue (2016).

== Languages ==
Nivkh is a dialect continuum. There is a high degree of variability of usage among Nivkhs depending on village, clan, and even the individual speaker. Varieties are traditionally grouped into four geographic clusters. These are the lower-Amur variety, the North Sakhalin variety (spoken on the coasts around the Amur Liman, including the mainland and west Sakhalin), the East Sakhalin variety (including populations around the Tym River), and the South Sakhalin variety (spoken around the Poronay River). The lexical and phonological differences across these varieties is great enough that specialists describe them as falling into two or three languages, though for purposes of language revival among a small and already divided population, Nivkh is generally presented as a single language, due to fears of the consequences of further division.

Gruzdeva (1998) notes that speakers of East Sakhalin and the lower Amur cannot understand each other, and divides the varieties into two languages, Nivkh proper (including the lower Amur, Northern Sakhalin / Straits and Western Sakhalin varieties) and Nighvng (the East and South Sakhalin varieties). Fortescue (2016) notes that the Amur, East Sakhalin and South Sakhalin varieties have low intelligibility with each other, and considers each of them to constitute a separate language.

== Classification ==
Nivkh is not known to be related to any other language, making it a language isolate. For convenience, it may be included in the geographical group of Paleosiberian languages. Many words in the Nivkh languages bear a certain resemblance to words of similar meaning in other Paleosiberian languages, Ainu, Korean, or Tungusic languages, but no regular sound correspondences have been discovered to systematically account for the vocabularies of these various families, so any lexical similarities are considered to be due to chance or to borrowing.

Michael Fortescue suggested in 1998 that Nivkh might be related to the Mosan languages of North America. Later, in 2011, he argued that Nivkh, which he referred to as an "isolated Amuric language", was related to the Chukotko-Kamchatkan languages, forming a Chukotko-Kamchatkan–Amuric language family. However, Glottolog considers the evidence to be "insufficient".

In 2015, Sergei Nikolaev argued in two papers for a systematic relationship between Nivkh and the Algic languages of North America, and a more distant relationship between these two together and the Wakashan languages of coastal British Columbia.

The Nivkh languages are included in the widely rejected Eurasiatic languages hypothesis by Joseph Greenberg.

An automated computational analysis (ASJP 4) by Müller et al. (2013) found lexical similarities among Nivkh, Mongolic, and Tungusic, likely due to lexical borrowings.

Hudson & Robbeets (2020) conjectured that a language that resembles Nivkh was once distributed in Korea and became the substratum of Koreanic languages. Kim Bang-han proposed that placename glosses in the Samguk sagi reflect the original language of the Korean peninsula and a component in the formation of both Korean and Japanese. He proposed that this language was related to Nivkh. Juha Janhunen suggests the possibility that similar consonant stop systems in Koreanic and Nivkh may be due to ancient contact.

== History ==
The Nivkh people have lived, by many accounts for thousands of years, on the island of Sakhalin and the Amur River. They maintained trade with the neighboring Ainu, Japanese, and Chinese, until Russian contact, which began in the 17th century. The 19th century shows the first recorded decline of Nivkh numbers, with official estimates dropping from 1856 to 1889. This coincided with smallpox epidemics and the expansion of Sakhalin's prisoner population, as Russia began sending groups of its convicts to Sakhalin in 1873. At this time, reportedly few Nivkh spoke Russian.

The official Russian census reported similar numbers of ethnic Nivkhs in 1897 (4,500) and in 2002 (5,200). However, the number of native speakers among the ethnic Nivkhs dropped from 100% to 23.3% in the same period. All recorded native Nivkh speakers were bilingual in Russian, most of them were born in 1920-1940s, when a significant decline in the number of native Nivkh speakers occurred, due to Joseph Stalin's policy of collectivization imposed on indigenous economies, and in many cases, driving Nivkh individuals to hired labor, marking a departure from traditional means of subsistence. Many Nivkh were forcibly displaced from their more widely spread settlements to Nogliki, a small city, in the process of centralization. The traditional Nivkh way of life was gradually and sometimes forcibly converted to a Soviet way of life, as changes in subsistence, diet, dwellings, and education have resulted. As of the 2010s, the Nivkh language was taught in grades 1–3 in several schools in both Sakhalin and Khabarovsk Krai. A monthly newspaper "Nivkh dif" (Nivkh language) is published in Sakhalin. Nivkh language books are also regularly published in Russia; Marina Temina has written textbooks in both the Amur and Sakhalin dialects of Nivkh.

== Phonology ==
=== Consonants ===
Nivkh consonants
		Labial	Alveolar	Palatal (-alveolar)	Velar	Uvular	Glottal
Nasal		m	n	ɲ	ŋ		
Plosive/ Affricate	tenuis	p	t	t͡ʃ ~ c	k	q	
Plosive/ Affricate	aspirated	pʰ	tʰ	t͡ʃʰ ~ cʰ	kʰ	qʰ	
Plosive/ Affricate	voiced	b	d	d͡ʒ ~ ɟ	ɡ	(ɢ)	
Fricative	voiceless	ɸ ~ f	s		x	χ	h
Fricative	voiced	β ~ v	z		ɣ	ʁ	
Approximant		(w)	l	j			
Trill	voiceless		r̥ʃ ~ ʃ				
Trill	voiced		r				

- The labial fricatives are weakly articulated, and have been described as both bilabial [ɸ, β] and labiodental [f, v].
- The palatal stops may have some degree of affrication, as [tʃʰ, tʃ].
- After nasals or /l/, the unaspirated stops become voiced [b, d, ɟ, ɡ, ɢ~g]. Unlike consonant alternation, this can occur within a morpheme.
- The Amur dialect deletes some word-final nasals, which leads to word-initial voiced stops, allophonic in other dialects, being phonemic in the Amur dialect.
- The voiceless trill is realized as [r̥ʃ] in East Sakhalin dialect (and presumably also in the Amur dialect, where it is written ⟨рш⟩) and as an untrilled [ʃ] in the North Sakhalin dialect.
- /ɢ, w/ are not present in the Amur dialect.

Consonants are palatalized in some contexts, most commonly in younger speakers, where all consonants are palatalized before [i] and [e]. Additionally, there is another context in which consonants are always palatalised, viz. before [e] when it precedes a uvular consonant [q, χ, ʁ], e.g. [pʰeq] > [pʰʲe̞q] ‘chicken’.

Nivkh features a process of consonant alternation like in Celtic languages, in which morpheme-initial stops alternate with fricatives and trills. Unlike Celtic languages, initial unaspirated plosives can also alternate with voiced plosives.

Consonant alternations in Nivkh
	Asp. plos. ↔ v.l. fric.					Unasp. plos. ↔ v. fric. ↔ v. plos.				
Stop	pʰ	tʰ	cʰ	kʰ	qʰ	p	t	c	k	q
Continuant	f	r̥	s	x	χ	v	r	z	ɣ	ʁ
Voiced stop	-					b	d	ɟ	ɡ	ɢ~g

Alterations occur when a morpheme is preceded by another morpheme within the same phrase (e.g. a prefix or an adjunct). When the preceding morpheme ends itself in a plosive, the following initial consonant (if a plosive) is lenited to a fricative. If the preceding morpheme ends itself in a fricative or trill, the hard stop is preserved. If the preceding morpheme ends in a (lost) nasal or /l/, and the following initial consonant is a unaspirated plosive, the initial consonant becomes a voiced plosive.

- ⟨тыф⟩ /təf/ 'house'
- ⟨ӈа рыф⟩ /ŋa‿rəf/ 'the animal's house'
- ⟨ӿемар тыф⟩ /hemar‿təf/ 'the old man's house'
- ⟨ӄан дыф⟩ /qan‿dəf/ 'the dog's house'
- ⟨ӿы дыф⟩ /həⁿ‿dəf/ 'that house' (ⁿ symbolises a lost nasal)

Only the morpheme-initial position is affected: other clusters ending in a stop are possible within a morpheme (e.g. /utku/ "man").

In some transitive verbs, the process has been noted to apparently run in reverse (fricatives/trills fortiting to stops, with the same distribution). This has been taken a distinct process, but has also been explained to be fundamentally the same, with the citation form of these verbs containing an underlying stop, lenited due to the presence of a former i- prefix (which still survives in the citation form of other verbs, where it causes regular consonant alternation). Initial fricatives in nouns never change.

=== Vowels ===
There are six vowels in Nivkh:

	Front	Central	Back
Close	i	ɨ ~ ə	u
Mid	e	ɨ ~ ə	o
Open		a	

Long vowels are not a phonemic feature of Nivkh, but they can be articulated in the case of prosody or compensatory lengthening when a fricative consonant is omitted after the vowel.

=== Stress ===
Stress tends to fall on the first syllable, although this could highly fluctuate, with dialectal variation. Minimal pairs distinguished by stress are ostensibly rare.

== Orthography ==
The Nivkh language uses a modified version of the Cyrillic alphabet.

Contemporary Nivkh Alphabet
А а	Б б	В в	Г г	Ӷ ӷ^{[a]}	Ғ ғ	Ӻ ӻ
/a/	/b/	/v/	/ɡ/	/ɢ/	/ɣ/	/ʁ/
Д д	Е е	Ё ё	З з	И и	Й й	К к
/d/	/(j)e/	/jo/^{[c]}	/z/	/i/	/j/	/k/
К‘ к‘	Ӄ ӄ (Қ қ)	Ӄ‘ ӄ‘ (Қ‘ қ‘)	Л л	М м	Н н	Ӈ ӈ (Ң ң)
/kʰ/	/q/	/qʰ/	/l/	/m/	/n/	/ŋ/
О о	П п	П‘ п‘	Р р	Р̌ р̌ (Р̆ р̆) / Рш рш^{[b]}	С с	Т т
/o/	/p/	/pʰ/	/r/	/r̥/ ~ /ʃ/	/s/	/t/
Т‘ т‘	У у	Ф ф	Х х	Ӽ ӽ (Ҳ ҳ)	Ӿ ӿ	Ч‘ ч‘
/tʰ/	/u/, /w/	/f/	/x/	/χ/	/h/	/t͡ʃʰ~cʰ/
ъ	ь	Ы ы	Э э	Ю ю	Я я	
^{[c]}	^{[d]}	/ə/	/e/	/ju/	/ja/	

a. Not present in Amur Nivkh.
b. ⟨Рш рш⟩ is the form used in Amur Nivkh.
c. Used to block palatalisation of /t/, /d/, /n/ before ⟨я⟩, ⟨и⟩, ⟨ё⟩, ⟨ю⟩.
d. Used to palatalise /t/, /d/, /n/ at the end of syllables.

The letters Ш (when not used in ⟨рш⟩) and Щ are only used in Russian loanwords. Various allographs of the letters with descenders are found, and er may take either a caron or a breve. The allographs in the parenthesis in the table above are the choice of Нивх диф, the only Nivkh newspaper.

When the letters ⟨т⟩, ⟨д⟩, and ⟨н⟩ are followed by a iotated vowel letter such as ⟨я⟩, ⟨е⟩, ⟨и⟩, ⟨ё⟩, ⟨ю⟩, or at the end of a syllable followed by ⟨ь⟩, they are palatalised as /t͡ʃ~c/, /d͡ʒ~ɟ/, and /ɲ/. At the beginning of a syllable, the letters Е, Ё, Ю, Я stands for /je, jo, ju, ja/.

== Grammar ==
Nivkh grammar is agglutinating with an SOV word order. Words consist of easily definable roots and productive morphemes, most of which are suffixes. There are no dedicated adjectives in Nivkh but the language has attributive verbs which precede their referent.

As Russian has become the dominant language in all spheres of life, Nivkh grammar has changed in the last century. For example, Nivkh has recently begun to mark plurals on counting nouns and pairs, a change that originated from the grammar rules of Russian. However, it has been postulated that due to the vastly disparate grammatical structures of the two languages, grammatical interference has not been extensive. Simplification has occurred by borrowing Russian structure though. Due to the disuse of the language and the changing culture, many of the complex morphological aspects of Nivkh have been simplified or become obsolete.

As described earlier, Nivkh consonants undergo a form of lenition wherein the initial consonant of a morpheme is changed by the final segment of the preceding morpheme, and these possible alterations are reflected in the charts and examples below.

The grammatical summary that follows is based mostly upon the Amur dialect, after Gruzdeva (1998).

=== Nouns ===
Nouns are formed by affixation of a noun root; of these affixes, only possession is expressed by prefixing, with various case and number distinctions expressed by suffixation. Overall, Nivkh nouns are constructed according to the following paradigm:

[poss] + STEM + [num/com] + [case]

==== Possession ====
Possession markers cliticize as prefixes on the noun. The prefixes нь-, ч-, п’- (ñ-, ţ‘, p‘-) are person-specific and derived from personal pronouns.

ньрыф
ñ-rəf
1SG-house
“my house”

==== Number ====
Nivkh has two grammatical numbers, singular and plural. There are echoes of dual number in the comitative suffixes as well as personal pronouns and the imperative. Singular is unmarked, whereas plural is expressed by the -ку/ғу/гу/ху (-ku/γu/gu/xu) suffix. Some nouns are inherently collective, and there are a few nouns with plurals formed by stem reduplication.

к‘у → к‘уғу
k‘u-Ø → k‘u-γu
arrow → arrows

Plural marking on nouns is broadly optional.

The comitative is expressed identically to number and has both plural and dual forms, governed respectively by the suffixes -ко(н)/ғо(н)/го(н)/хo(н) (-ko(n)/γo(n)/go(n)/xo(n)) and -ке/ғе/ге/хe (-ke/γe/ge/xe). Comitative suffixes can also appear with the plural suffix.

Ни ӈаӄрух к‘екхо ӿыйкхо дифку ньршыдь.
Ñi ŋaqr-ux k‘eq-xo həjk-xo ḑif-ku ñřə-ḑ.
I snow-LOC/ABL fox-COM:PL hare-COM:PL track-PL see-IND
“I saw foxes’ and hares’ tracks in the snow.”

Comitative suffixes in Amur Nivkh
	Base	Len.	Voiced	Len. (vl.)
Conjoining two different nouns
Singular	-ке -ke	-ғе -γe	-ге -ge	-хе -xe
Plural	-ко -ko	-ғо -γo	-го -go	-хо -xo
Representative plural	-кон -kon	-ғон -γon	-гон -gon	-хон -xon
Conjoining three or more different nouns
Direct object	-тоғо -toγo	-роғо -roγo	-доғо -doγo	~
Direct/Oblique object	-ы/е -ə/e			
Generic particle	=ӿара =hara			

==== Case ====
Nivkh has eight to ten grammatical cases, depending on dialect. All cases are expressed via suffixation.

Cases in Amur Nivkh
	Singular				Plural			
	Base	Len.^{[a]}	Voiced^{[b]}	Len. (vl.)^{[c]}	Base	Len.	Voiced	Len. (vl.)
Nominative	-∅				-ку -ku	-ғу -γu	-гу -gu	-ху -xu
Agentive (Dative-Accusative)	-(а)ӽ -(a)χ				-куаӽ -kuaχ	-ғуаӽ -γuaχ	-гуаӽ -guaχ	-хуаӽ -xuaχ
Dative/Additive	-тоӽ -toχ	-роӽ -roχ	-доӽ -doχ	~	-кудоӽ -kudoχ	-ғудоӽ -γudoχ	-гудоӽ -gudoχ	-худоӽ -xudoχ
Instrumental	-кир -kir	-гир -gir	-ғир -γir	-хир -kir	-кугир -kugir	-ғугир -γugir	-гугир -gugir	-хугир -xugir
Locative	-((у)и)н -((u)i)n				-куин -kuin	-ғуин -γuin	-гуин -guin	-хуин -xuin
Locative-Ablative	-(у)х -(u)x				-куух -kuux	-ғуух -γuux	-гуух -guux	-хуух -xuux
Perlative^{[d]}	-уғе -uγe				~			
Destinative	-т‘ыкы -t‘əkə -т‘ӽа -t‘χa -тоӻо -toʁo	-ршыкы -řəkə -ршӽа -řχa -роӻо -roʁo	~ -рга -rga -доӻо -doʁo	~	~			
Comparative	-(ы)к -(ə)k				~			
Vocative	-а -a (or lengthen (and sometimes open) final vowel)				-ко~-ку -kō~-kū	-ғо~-ғу -γō~-γū	-го~-гу -gō~-gū	-хо~-ху -xō~-xū

a. After vowels or (voiced) plosives
b. After nasals (including lost), /l/, and /r/
c. After voiceless consonants
d. Not present in some sources.

Nominative is the case of a subject, direct object, indirect object, an adverbial modifier of time or an attribute.

Тьолф ньытк чо ңаңғдь.
T’olf-Ø n’ytk-Ø čo-Ø ņaņɣ-d’.
summer-NOM my-father-NOM fish-NOM look-for-FIN
“In summer my father fishes.”

Dative/Accusative is used to express the animate causee in a causative statement, as well as in certain indirect or narrative constructions.

Ньнанх ньаҳ пхироҳ вигудь.
N’-nanx-Ø n’-aχ pxi-roχvi-gu-d’.
my-elder.sister-NOM I-DAT/ACC forest-DAT/ADD go-CAUS-FIN
“My elder sister let me go to the forest.”

The Dative/Additive case marks an entity or place to which an action is directed or the ending point of a sequence.

Ньи вынь дьырдоҳ мырдь.
N’i-Ø vyn’-Ø d’yr-doχ myr-d’.
I-NOM copper-NOM brim-DAT/ADD rise-FIN
“I rose to the brim of the copper.”

The Instrumental case governs the instrument used in an action as well as the material from which something is constructed or a manner of action.

Ньытык қаҳкир қ’отр к’удь.
N’-ytyk-Ø ķaχ-kir ķ’otr-Ø k’u-d’.
I-father-NOM spear-INS bear-NOM kill-FIN
“My father killed the bear with a spear.”

Present only in the Amur dialect, Locative case governs place or time of action, and is also used to denote possession.

Ньын ӿы дывуин к’одьра.
N’yņ-Ø hy dyv-uin k’o-d’-ra.
we-NOM this house-LOC sleep-FIN-PTL:PRED
“We slept in this house.”

The Locative/Ablative case expresses the beginning of a sequence or temporal event, and can also indicate an entity from which something is taken away.

Умгу ньох п’удь.
Umgu-Ø n’o-x p’u-d’.
woman-NOM barn-LOC/ABL come.out-FIN
“A woman came out from the barn.”

Destinative or Limitative case is similar to the Dative/Accusative but has a narrower definition of terminal action.

Чытк ӿаимңафтоғо ӿунындра.
Č-ytk-Ø haimņaf-toɣo hunv-nd-ra.
you-father-NOM old.age-LIM live-FIN-PTL:PRED
“Your father lived up to old age.”

The Comparative is a true grammatical case in Nivkh, drawing a direct comparison between two entities.

Тлани канӊык еғдь.
Tlaņi-Ø kanņ-yk eɣ-d’.
reindeer-NOM dog-COMP be.fast-FIN
“A reindeer is faster than a dog.”

Finally, the Vocative is used to address people.

Оӻлагу/Оӻлаго! П‘рыве!
Oʁla-gū/Oʁla-gōǃ P‘rə-veǃ
child-PLVOC come-IMP:2PL
"Children! Come (over here)!"

=== Verbs ===
Verbs are formed via affixation of a verb stem according to the following paradigm:

[voice] + [STEM] + [trans] + [neg] + [tense/aspect] + [caus] + [mod] + [evid] + [mood] + [num]

Multiple aspect and modality markers can appear simultaneously.

There is virtually no overt pronominal marking of subjects or objects within the broader verb structure of Nivkh; word order is the sole determiner of constituents, and subjects are usually dropped as well.

Voice

The Active versus Passive paradigm familiar to English speakers does not exist in Nivkh. Both reflexive and reciprocal constructions are realized by prefixing, which is relatively rare in the language.

Reflexives are most often constructed using the cliticizing prefix п’- (p’-).

п’лыв
p’-lyv
RFL-hide
“to hide oneself”

Reciprocal forms are often idiomatic, but there are a few dozen archaic verbs that carry the inherent reciprocal prefixes в-, у- or о- (v-, u-, o-). In non-reciprocal free variants, these prefixes are replaced by j/и- (j/i-).

јағағ → вағағ
j-aɣaɣ- → v-aɣaɣ-
“disturb” → “disturb each other”

Transitivity

Transitivity is expressed phonetically; intransitive verbs begin with a plosive and transitives with a fricative. However, a small class of verbs carries the transivitizing suffix -у- (-u-).

волу
vol-u
fall-TRANS
“to throw something down”

Negation

Verb forms are negated using the finite suffix -р/тла- (-r/tla-). Beyond verb suffixing, there are many lexical and grammatical methods of expressing negation in Nivkh.

Tense

There are only two verb tenses in Nivkh, non-future and future. Non-future is unmarked whereas future tense takes the -ны- (-ny-) suffix. The non-future form may combine with adverbials, as well as context, to indicate a timeframe.

Иф раныдь.
If ra-ny-d’.
he drink-FUT-FIN
“He will drink.”

Aspect

There are a number of aspectual distinctions in Nivkh, all of which are expressed via suffixation. In the Amur dialect, there are two very common aspect suffixes with multiple semantic expressions.

The suffix -иву- (-ivu-) marks the imperfective aspect when used with a verb that refers to a state or event, which then becomes a process. Conversely, when included with a verb that refers to a process, it marks the egressive, indicating the beginning of that process.

Вуквукуивудь.
Vukvuku-ivu-d’.
be.dark-IMPRF-FIN
“It is getting dark.”

The suffix -к/ғыт- (-k/ɣyt-) is perfective when used with a verb referencing a state or limited process, converting it to an event. With a verb referencing a specific event, the suffix indicates the intensive aspect, emphasizing the extent or intensity of the event. With a verb referring to a multiplicative process, it indicates the semelfactive, making it a singular event.

Ки вағтькытдь.
Ki vaɣt’-kyt-d’.
footwear wear.out-INT-FIN
“The footwear is entirely worn out.”

Causative

Verbs are made causative by the inclusion of the suffix -к/гу (-k/gu).

Иф ньаҳ магазиндоҳ вигудь.
If n’-aχ magazine-doχ vi-gu-d’.
he I-DAT/ACC shop-DAT/ADD go-CAUS-FIN
“He made me go to the shop.”

Mood

Indicative and Imperative are the only two established grammatical moods in Nivkh.

Declarative statements in the indicative mood often carry the finite suffix -дь/т’ (-d’/t’). Sentences containing multiple coordinating verbal forms are otherwise marked with -ра/та (-ra/ta). A plural subject can be marked, optionally, with -к/ғ/г/ху (-k/ɣ/g/xu).

Imperative mood structures are declinable according to the person and number of the subject, as in the chart below.

Imperative Markers
	Singular	Dual	Plural
1st Person	-ныкта -nykta	-ныте -nyte	-да -da
2nd Person	-я -ja		-в/б/пе -v/b/pe
3rd Person	-ӻазо -ĝazo		-ӻазо- -ĝazo

In modern Nivkh, the first person dual form is no longer used. When an imperative is addressed to an older or unfamiliar person, the suffix -наве (-nave) is used instead of the standard ending.

Copula

The verb му (mu, to be/become) is used as a copula in declarative sentences. It is obligatory in future tense but optional elsewhere.

Ньи рыуньивх мудь.
N’i ryun’ivx mu-d’.
I teacher be-FIN
“I am a teacher.”

Non-finite verb forms

Non-finite verbal forms can be divided into participles and converbs.

The participle is similar to a finite verb except that it generally lacks the finite suffix and carries modality suffixes, of which there are many in the language. Attributives that function as verbs fall into this category.

раюғыт хаузул
raju-ɣyt xauzul
write-PRF paper
“paper covered with writing”

Converbs are characterized by the presence of aspect and modality suffixes, but are generally not marked for number or tense. There are dozens of modal suffixes in Nivkh expressing distinctions such as temporality, conditionality, concession, causation and more.

қ’охрыры
ķ’o-xryry
sleep-CONV:CAUSL
“because I was sleeping”

Notably, and as distinct from virtually every other verb form in the language, converbs take overt subject marking in one of three possible suffix forms, each having a different aspectual connotation.

Person	Agreement Prefix					
Person	Set A		Set B		Set C	
Person	Singular	Plural	Singular	Plural	Singular	Plural
1st Person	-т -t	-т -t	-тот -tot	-тот -tot	-та -ta	-та -ta
2nd Person	-р -r	-т -t	-рор -ror	-тот -tot	-ра -ra	-та -ta
3rd Person	-р -r	-т -t	-рор -ror	-тот -tot	-ра -ra	-та -ta

The Set A markers imply a completed action or one simultaneous with the finite predicate, Set B denotes a completed action within a sequence and Set C is used primarily to link a number of verb phrases into a temporal sequence. Thus:

иф п’рыр ит’
if p’ry-r it-t’
he come-CONV:NAR-3SG say-FIN
“having come, he said”

Converbs usually function similarly to adverbs or govern entire subordinate predicates; this essentially takes on the entire role of conjunctions, which do not truly exist in Nivkh.

In addition to these, Nivkh boasts a rich variety of adverbial forms that express an extremely complex system of spatial reference.

=== Pronouns ===
All Nivkh pronouns take regular case endings. Dual forms exist only in the first person, and the first person plural is inherently exclusive.

Personal Pronouns
	Singular	Dual	Plural
1st Person	ньи n’i	меги / меге megi / mege	ньыӊ n’yņ
2nd Person	чи či		чың čyņ
3rd Person	иф if		имӊ imņ

Instead of dedicated possessive pronouns, which do not exist in any variety of Nivkh, possession is expressed as a dual or plural personal pronoun in the nominative, as in:

ньың доқо
n’yņ-Ø doķo-Ø
we-PL-NOM kitchen.garden-NOM
“our kitchen garden”

Reflexivity in pronouns is indicated by the particle п’и (p’i), which can cliticize onto a number of morphological categories.

Ымык п’ерҳ п’оғлабодь.
Ymyk p’e-rχ p’-oɣlabo-d’.
mother herself-DAT/ADD REFL-child take-FIN
“Mother took her child to herself.”

== Language contact with the Ainu people ==
The Ainu appear to have experienced intensive contact with the Nivkhs during the course of their history. It is not known to what extent this has affected Nivkh. Linguists generally believe the vocabulary shared between the Ainu language and Nivkh (historically spoken in the northern half of Sakhalin and the Asian mainland facing it) is due to borrowing.

== Sample text ==
Sample text in Amur Nivkh, excerpt from "К‘ыск" by Valentina Akilyak-Ivanova.

Nivkh	IPA transcription	Russian	English
Ығркы, р̆а воух лу, нивх нен ньр̆ак ӈа ӈыӈ маӈла нивх п‘уру. Ӿы нивх ӿер̆кух, ӈа ӈыӈр видь, т‘улф ӿаӈан, ч‘олӈи оӄ ӿизри, п‘и п‘ундь ғер р̆ора. К‘еӄлу сидьлу лыйндь ӿакур, иғндь ӿакур, к‘узирари, ӿайныр видь. Вике, к‘ыскху ӄоюдь мыдь фуру. Кырғыр ӿер̆кух «мяу» ӿар, алвре ӿағар ӻаврғытр̆, т‘ый энверӄтох «мяу» ӿағар, анти ӿукр̆тох т‘ырғар ӻаврғытр.	/əːrkə r̥ʃa βoux lu, ɲiβx ɲen ɲr̥ʃak ŋa ŋəŋ maŋla ɲiβx pʰuru ‖ hə ɲiβx her̥ʃkux ŋa ŋəŋr βiɟ tʰulɸ haŋan cʰolŋi oq hizri, pʰi pʰunɟ ɣer r̥ʃora ‖ kʰeqlu siɟlu ləjnɟ hakur iːnɟ hakur kʰuzirari hajnər viɟ ‖ βike kʰəsxːu qojuɟ məɟ ɸuru ‖ kərɣər her̥ʃkux mjau har alβre haːar ʁaβrɣətr̥ʃ tʰəj enβerqtox mjau haːar anci hukr̥ʃtox tʰərɣar ʁaβrɣətr ‖/	Давным давно, в одном стойбище жил охотник. Он мастерски добывал разных зверей и птиц. Этот человек пошел на охоту. Была зима, одел шубу из оленьей шкуры, взял с собой свой лук и стрелу, в надежде встретить лису или что-нибудь, поставить петли, ловушки и пошел. Вдруг он услышал мяуканье кошек за спиной, «мяу» он оглянулся. Нет, никого. Еще с другой сторны «мяу», посмотрел нет.	Long ago, a hunter lived in a settlement. He masterfully hunted various animals and birds. This person set out to hunt. It was winter; he put on his deerskin coat, took with him his bow and arrow, in the hope of encountering a fox or something, set snares and traps and left. Suddenly, he heard the meowing of cats behind him, "meow", he looked back. There was no one there. Then from another side came another "meow", he saw nothing.

== See also ==
- List of Proto-Nivkh reconstructions (Wiktionary)

== Bibliography ==
- Arefiev, A. L. (А. Л. Арефьев) (2014). Yazyki korennykh malochislennykh narodov Severa, Sibiri i Dalnego Vostoka v sisteme obrazovaniya: istoriya i sovremennost Языки коренных малочисленных народов Севера, Сибири и Дальнего Востока в системе образования: история и современность [Languages of the Indigenous Minorities of the North, Siberia and the Far East in Educational System: Past and Present] (PDF) (in Russian). Moskva: Tsentr sotsialnogo prognozirovaniya i marketinga. ISBN 978-5-906001-21-4. Archived from the original (PDF) on 2 February 2022.
- Gruzdeva, Ekaterina (1998). Nivkh. Munich: Lincom Europa. ISBN 3-89586-039-5.
- Gruzdeva, E (2020). "Demonstratives in Nivkh". Studia Orientalia Electronica. 1: 1–60.
- Gruzdeva, E (2022). "Possessive and caritive in Nivkh". International Journal of Eurasian Linguistics. 4: 7–22. doi:10.1163/25898833-00410016. hdl:10138/350313.
- Maddieson, Ian (1984). Patterns of sounds. Cambridge: Cambridge University Press. ISBN 0-521-26536-3.
- Mattissen, Johanna (2003). Dependent-Head Synthesis in Nivkh: A Contribution to a Typology of Polysynthesis. Amsterdam: John Benjamins Publishing. ISBN 1-58811-476-7.
- Nedjalkov, Vladimir P.; Otaina, Galina A. (2013). A Syntax of the Nivkh Language: The Amur Dialect. Amsterdam: John Benjamins Publishing.
- Tangiku, Itsuji 丹菊逸治 (2008). Nivufugo Saharin hōgen kiso goishū (Soguriki shūhen chiiki) ニヴフ語サハリン方言基礎語彙集 (ソグリキ周辺地域) [Basic Vocabulary of the Sakhalin Dialect of Nivkh Language (Nogliki Dialect)] (in Japanese). Tōkyō: Tōkyō Gaikokugo Daigaku Ajia Afurika Gengo Bunka Kenkyūjo.
