= Languages of the Soviet Union =

Language policy in the Soviet Union

Languages of Soviet Union
- Official: Russian
- Regional: Armenian, Azerbaijani, Belarusian, Estonian, Georgian, Kazakh, Kyrgyz, Latvian, Lithuanian, Moldovan (Romanian), Tajik, Turkmen, Ukrainian, Uzbek
- Minority: Several minority languages. See distribution and status section for a full list.
- Foreign: English, German

The languages of the Soviet Union consist of hundreds of different languages and dialects from several different language groups.

In 1922, it was decreed that all nationalities in the Soviet Union had the right to education in their own language. The new orthography used the Cyrillic, Latin, or Arabic alphabet, depending on geography and culture. After 1937, all languages that had received new alphabets after 1917 began using the Cyrillic alphabet. This way, it would be easier for linguistic minorities to learn to write both Russian and their native language. Moreover, the Armenian and Georgian, as well as the Baltic Soviet Socialist Republics were the only Soviet republics to maintain their writing systems (Armenian, Georgian and Latin alphabets respectively).

== Language policy ==
=== Background ===
Before the Bolshevik Revolution, Russian was the official language for the Russian Empire, with the exception of a few permitted languages in autonomous regions as Poland, Finland, and the Baltic provinces. Regional languages were discouraged or forbidden, as was the case of Ukrainian between 1876 and 1905. There was no explicit plan to enable non-Russians to learn Russian, and there was no possibility for other ethnic groups to develop their own culture and language.

In this period, some individual efforts developed written forms for some of these languages, but they had limited effect and they were focused on missionary activities. In the case of languages with written tradition, as Armenian, Georgian, Turkic languages of Central Asia, and Tajik, their writing system continued being used, but mainly in connection with religious education.

=== Soviet language policy ===
In 1914 Vladimir Lenin was opposed to the idea of a compulsory or official state language. Equality of all peoples and of all languages was a commitment made by Lenin and his associates before and after the October Revolution. As a result, no single language was designated for official use in the Soviet Union and the existence of the spoken languages of the national minorities was guaranteed. Everyone had the right to use their own language, both in private and public, as well as in correspondence with officials and while giving testimony in court. The USSR was a multilingual state, with around 130 languages spoken natively. Discrimination on the basis of language was illegal under the Soviet Constitution, though the status of its languages differed.

However, the Soviet Union faced the problem of unifying the country, and for that reason, Russian was selected as the common language to facilitate communication between members of different ethnic groups.

=== Developing writing systems ===
Few of the languages of the Soviet state had written forms. One of the first priorities of the Soviet state was the creation of writing systems and the development of literacy programs. New or modified writing systems were adopted for over half of the languages spoken in the Union during the early Post-revolutionary years. In some particular cases, preparatory work was required before the creation of an orthography due to the lack of previous linguistic analysis, as in the case of languages of the Far North.

When a language already had a writing system, there were attempts for making it more accessible and easier to learn. As part of this policy, in 1918 Russian orthography was simplified by removing orthographic distinctions without phonetic counterparts. Phonemic or close to phonemic orthographies weren't modified, such as Armenian, Georgian, or Chuvash.

Writing systems based on the Arabic script caused major problems because they were poorly adapted to indicate phonemic differences that are found in Turkic languages or Northeast Caucasian languages. A first attempt tried to create a simplified form of the Arabic script. However, this task was abandoned. Instead, the Latin alphabet was used for all languages of the Soviet Union without a traditional alphabetical writing system, avoiding the impression that the policy was a Russification attempt.

Written forms were developed for several languages with a very small number of speakers, such as the Finno-Ugric languages Karelian, Veps, and the Sámi languages. However, many of these writing systems had a short life. In the case of Itelmen, its writing system never was put into practical use. Other languages that received their writing systems during the 1920s and early 1930s kept using them, such as Nanai, Nivkh, Koryak, Chukchi, Khanty, and Mansi.

== Distribution and status ==
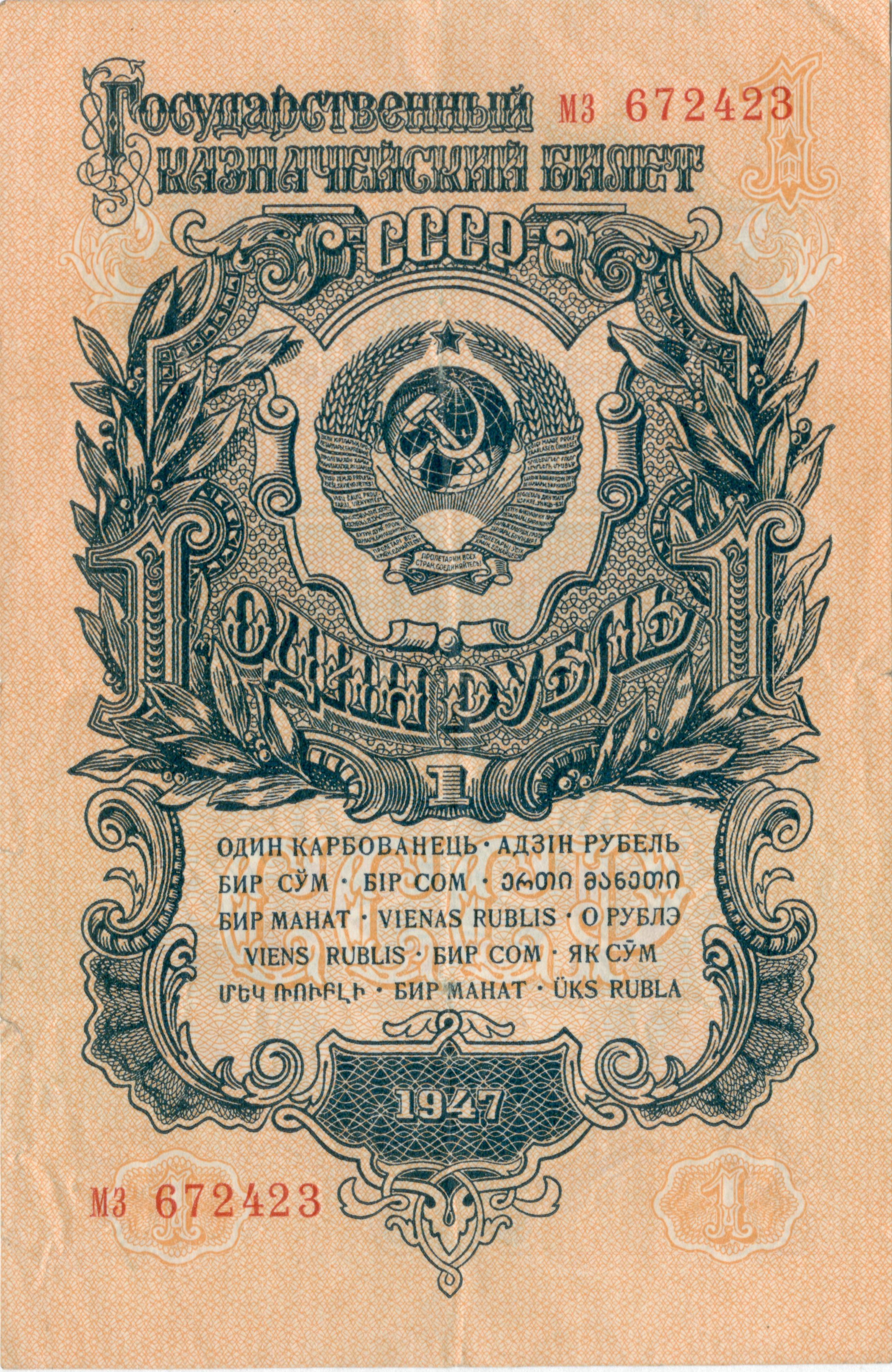
A 1947 (1957 issue) one-ruble bill, with the denomination marked in 15 languages: Один рубль (Russian), Один карбованець (Ukrainian), Адзін рубель (Belarusian), Бир сўм/Bir so‘m (Uzbek), Бiр сом (Kazakh), ერთი მანეთი /Erti maneti/ (Georgian), Бир Манат/Bir Manat (Azeri), Vienas rublis (Lithuanian), О рублэ/O rublă ("Moldovan"/Romanian), Viens rublis (Latvian), Бир Сом (Kyrgyz), Як сўм (Tajik), Մեկ ռուբլի/Mek rrubli/ (Armenian), Бир Манат/Bir Manat (Turkmen), Üks rubla (Estonian)

The main East Slavic languages (Russian, Belarusian and Ukrainian) dominated in the European part of the Soviet Union. In the Baltic region Uralic Estonian and the Baltic languages of Lithuanian and Latvian, were used next to Russian, while "Moldovan" (that is, Romanian, the only official Romance language in the union) was used in the southwest region. In the Caucasus alongside Russian there were Armenian, Azerbaijani and Georgian. In Central Asia there was Kazakh, Uzbek, Turkmen, Kyrgyz, and Tajik. Which are all Turkic with the exception of Tajik, which is an Iranian language.

Although the USSR did not have a de jure official language over most of its history (until 1990), Russian was defined as the language of interethnic communication (Russian: язык межнационального общения). It was however the de facto official language. For its role and influence in the USSR, see Russification.

On a second level were the languages of the other 14 Union Republics. In line with their de jure status in a federal state, they had a small formal role at the Union level (being e.g. present in the Coat of arms of the USSR and its banknotes) and as the main language of its republic. Their effective weight, however, varied with the republic (from strong in places like in Armenia to weak in places like in Byelorussia), or even inside it.

Of these fourteen languages, two are often considered varieties of other languages: Tajik of Persian, and Moldovan of Romanian. Strongly promoted use of Cyrillic in many republics however, combined with lack of contact, led to the separate development of the literary languages. Some of the former Soviet republics, now independent states, continue to use the Cyrillic alphabet at present (such as Kyrgyzstan and the unrecognized Transnistria), while others have opted to use the Latin alphabet instead (such as Turkmenistan and Moldova).

The Autonomous republics of the Soviet Union and other subdivision of the USSR lacked even this de jure autonomy, and their languages had virtually no presence at the national level (and often, not even in the urban areas of the republic itself). They were, however, present in education (although often only at lower grades).

Some smaller languages with very dwindling small communities, like Livonian, were neglected, and weren't present either in education or in publishing.

Several languages of the non-titular nations, like German, Korean or Polish, though having sizeable populations, and in some cases being present in education and publishing, were not considered to be Soviet languages. On the other hand, Finnish, although not generally considered a language of the USSR, was an official language in the Karelian ASSR and its predecessor the Karelo-Finnish SSR. Also Yiddish and Romani were considered Soviet languages.

Languages by family, distribution and status
Language Family	Language	Official in	Distribution	Status
Indo-European > Slavic > East Slavic	Russian	Soviet Union Russian SFSR	Spoken in all republics	Safe
Indo-European > Slavic > East Slavic > Ruthenian	Ukrainian	Ukrainian SSR	Ukrainian SSR, Russian SSR, Byelorussian SSR, Estonian SSR, Moldavian SSR, Georgian SSR	Safe
Indo-European > Slavic > East Slavic > Ruthenian	Belarusian	Byelorussian SSR	Byelorussian SSR, Russian SSR, Ukrainian SSR, Latvian SSR, Lithuanian SSR	Potentially vulnerable
Indo-European > Slavic > East Slavic > Ruthenian	Rusyn		Ukrainian SSR	Endangered/unsafe
Indo-European > Slavic > West Slavic	Polish		Ukrainian SSR, Byelorussian SSR, Estonian SSR	
Indo-European > Slavic > West Slavic	Slovak		Ukrainian SSR, Byelorussian SSR, Georgian SSR	Potentially vulnerable
Indo-European > Slavic > South Slavic > Eastern	Bulgarian		Ukrainian SSR, Moldavian SSR	Potentially vulnerable
Indo-European > Baltic > Eastern	Latvian	Latvian SSR	Latvian SSR	Safe
Indo-European > Baltic > Eastern	Latgalian		Latvian SSR	Potentially vulnerable
Indo-European > Baltic > Eastern	Lithuanian	Lithuanian SSR	Lithuanian SSR	Safe
Indo-European > Baltic > Eastern	Samogitian		Lithuanian SSR	
Indo-European > Germanic > North Germanic	Norwegian (Finnmark Dialect)		Russian SSR	
Indo-European > Germanic > North Germanic	Swedish (Estonian Dialect)		Estonian SSR, Ukrainian SSR	Critically endangered
Indo-European > Germanic > West Germanic > Rhenish	Volga German	Volga German ASSR	Russian SSR, Ukrainian SSR, Estonian SSR, Kazakh SSR	
Indo-European > Germanic > West Germanic > High German	Yiddish	Jewish AO	Russian SSR, Ukrainian SSR, Byelorussian SSR	Potentially vulnerable
Indo-European > Germanic > West Germanic > North Sea Germanic	Plautdietsch		Kazakh SSR	
Indo-European > Romance > Romanian	Romanian	Moldavian ASSR Moldavian SSR	Moldavian SSR, Ukrainian SSR	Safe
Indo-European > Romance > Italo-Western	Italian		Ukrainian SSR	
Indo-European > Albanian	Albanian		Ukrainian SSR	
Indo-European > Hellenic > Attic-Ionic	Pontic Greek		Russian SSR, Ukrainian SSR, Georgian SSR, Armenian SSR, Kazakh SSR	Definitely endangered
Indo-European > Armenian	Eastern Armenian	Armenian SSR Nagorno-Karabakh AO	Armenian SSR	Safe
Indo-European > Armenian	Western Armenian		Armenian SSR	Potentially vulnerable
Indo-European > Armenian & Indo-Aryan	Lomavren		Armenian SSR	Critically endangered
Indo-European > Indo-Aryan > Romani > Baltic Romani	Estonian Čuxny Romani		Estonian SSR	
Indo-European > Indo-Aryan > Romani > Baltic Romani	Latvian Lettish Romani		Latvian SSR	
Indo-European > Indo-Aryan > Romani > Baltic Romani	Lithuanian Romani		Lithuanian SSR	
Indo-European > Indo-Aryan > Romani > Baltic Romani	North Russian Romani		Russian SSR,	
Indo-European > Indo-Aryan > Romani > Baltic Romani	Belarusian Romani		Byelorussian SSR	
Indo-European > Indo-Aryan > Romani > Vlax Romani	Ukrainian Vlax Romani		Ukrainian SSR	
Indo-European > Indo-Aryan > Romani > Vlax Romani	Kalderaš Romani		Russian SSR	
ndo-European > Indo-Aryan > Romani > Balkan Romani	Crimean Kyrymitika Romani		Ukrainian SSR	
ndo-European > Indo-Aryan > Romani > Balkan Romani	Ursari Romani		Russian SSR	
Indo-European > Indo-Aryan > Domari	Garachi		Azerbaijan SSR	
Indo-European > Indo-Aryan	Parya		Tajik SSR, Uzbek SSR	Definitely endangered
Indo-European > Iranian > West Iranian	Tajik	Tajik SSR	Tajik SSR	Potentially vulnerable
Indo-European > Iranian > West Iranian	Bukharian Dialect (Judeo-Tajik)		Tajik SSR, Uzbek SSR	Definitely endangered
Indo-European > Iranian > West Iranian	Kurdish (Kurmanji Dialect)		Azerbaijan SSR, Russian SSR, Armenian SSR, Georgian SSR,	Definitely endangered
Indo-European > Iranian > West Iranian	Tat	Dagestan ASSR	Azerbaijan SSR, Russian SSR	Severely endangered
Indo-European > Iranian > West Iranian	Juhuri (Judeo-Tat)		Azerbaijan SSR, Russian SSR	Endangered/unsafe
Indo-European > Iranian > West Iranian	Talysh		Azerbaijan SSR	Potentially vulnerable
Indo-European > Iranian > East Iranian > Scythian	Ossetian	North Ossetian ASSR South Ossetian AO	Georgian SSR, Russian SSR	Endangered/unsafe
Indo-European > Iranian > East Iranian > Scythian	Yaghnobi		Tajik SSR	Endangered/unsafe
Indo-European > Iranian > East Iranian > Scythian/Pamiri	Wakhi		Tajik SSR	Endangered/unsafe
Indo-European > Iranian > East Iranian > Pamiri	Rushani		Tajik SSR	Endangered/unsafe
Indo-European > Iranian > East Iranian > Pamiri	Shughni		Tajik SSR	Endangered/unsafe
Indo-European > Iranian > East Iranian > Pamiri	Yazghulami		Tajik SSR	Endangered/unsafe
Indo-European > Iranian > East Iranian > Pamiri	Bartangi		Tajik SSR	Endangered/unsafe
Indo-European > Iranian > East Iranian > Pamiri	Ishkashimi		Tajik SSR	Endangered/unsafe
Indo-European > Iranian > East Iranian > Pamiri	Khufi		Tajik SSR	Endangered/unsafe
Indo-European > Iranian > East Iranian > Pamiri	Sanglechi		Tajik SSR	Endangered/unsafe
Kartvelian	Svan		Georgian SSR, Russian SSR	Endangered/unsafe
Kartvelian > Karto-Zan	Georgian	Georgian SSR	Georgian SSR	Safe
Kartvelian > Karto-Zan > Georgian	Kivruli/Gruzinic Dialect (Judeo-Georgian)		Georgian SSR	Endangered/unsafe
Kartvelian > Karto-Zan > Zan	Mingrelian		Georgian SSR, Russian SSR	Definitely endangered
Kartvelian > Karto-Zan > Zan	Laz		Georgian SSR	Endangered/unsafe
Northwest Caucasian	Abkhaz	Abkhaz ASSR	Georgian SSR	Potentially vulnerable
Northwest Caucasian	Abaza	Karachay-Cherkess AO	Russian SSR	Endangered/unsafe
Northwest Caucasian	Kabardian (East Circassian)	Kabardino-Balkarian ASSR Karachay-Cherkess AO	Russian SSR	Potentially vulnerable
Northwest Caucasian	Adyghe (West Circassian)	Adyghe AO	Russian SSR	Endangered/unsafe
Northwest Caucasian	Ubykh		Russian SSR	Extinct
Northeast Caucasian > Nakh	Chechen	Checheno-Ingush ASSR Dagestan ASSR	Russian SSR, Azerbaijan SSR, Ukrainian SSR, Kirghiz SSR, Kazakh SSR, Georgian SSR	Potentially vulnerable
Northeast Caucasian > Nakh	Ingush	Checheno-Ingush ASSR	Russian SSR, Kazakh SSR, Uzbek SSR, Turkmen SSR	Potentially vulnerable
Northeast Caucasian > Nakh	Bats		Georgian SSR	Severely endangered
Northeast Caucasian > Avar-Andic	Avar	Dagestan ASSR	Russian SSR, Ukrainian SSR, Georgian SSR, Azerbaijan SSR, Kazakh SSR	Potentially vulnerable
Northeast Caucasian > Avar-Andic	Andi		Russian SSR	Endangered/unsafe
Northeast Caucasian > Avar-Andic	Tindi		Russian SSR	Definitely endangered
Northeast Caucasian > Avar-Andic	Bagvalal		Russian SSR	Definitely endangered
Northeast Caucasian > Avar-Andic	Akhvakh		Russian SSR, Azerbaijan SSR	Definitely endangered
Northeast Caucasian > Avar-Andic	Karata-Tukita		Russian SSR	Definitely endangered
Northeast Caucasian > Avar-Andic	Botlikh		Russian SSR	Definitely endangered
Northeast Caucasian > Avar-Andic	Godoberi		Russian SSR	Definitely endangered
Northeast Caucasian > Avar-Andic	Chamalal		Russian SSR	Definitely endangered
Northeast Caucasian > Dargin	Dargwa	Dagestan ASSR	Russian SSR	Potentially vulnerable
Northeast Caucasian > Dargin	Kaitag		Russian SSR	
Northeast Caucasian > Dargin	Kubachi		Russian SSR	
Northeast Caucasian > Dargin	Itsari		Russian SSR	
Northeast Caucasian > Dargin	Chirag		Russian SSR	Severely endangered
Northeast Caucasian > Khinalug	Khinalug		Azerbaijan SSR	Definitely endangered
Northeast Caucasian > Lak	Lak	Dagestan ASSR	Russian SSR	Potentially vulnerable
Northeast Caucasian > Lezgic	Archi		Russian SSR	Definitely endangered
Northeast Caucasian > Lezgic	Lezgian	Dagestan ASSR	Russian SSR, Azerbaijan SSR	Potentially vulnerable
Northeast Caucasian > Lezgic	Tabasaran	Dagestan ASSR	Russian SSR, Ukrainian SSR	Potentially vulnerable
Northeast Caucasian > Lezgic	Aghul		Russian SSR, Azerbaijan SSR	Definitely endangered
Northeast Caucasian > Lezgic	Rutul		Russian SSR, Azerbaijan SSR	Endangered/unsafe
Northeast Caucasian > Lezgic	Tsakhur		Russian SSR, Azerbaijan SSR	Endangered/unsafe
Northeast Caucasian > Lezgic	Udi		Russian SSR, Azerbaijan SSR, Georgian SSR	Definitely endangered
Northeast Caucasian > Lezgic	Kryts		Azerbaijan SSR	
Northeast Caucasian > Lezgic	Jek		Azerbaijan SSR	
Northeast Caucasian > Lezgic	Budukh		Azerbaijan SSR	Definitely endangered
Northeast Caucasian > Tsezic	Tsez		Russian SSR	Definitely endangered
Northeast Caucasian > Tsezic	Bezhta		Russian SSR	Definitely endangered
Northeast Caucasian > Tsezic	Hunzib		Russian SSR, Georgian SSR	Definitely endangered
Northeast Caucasian > Tsezic	Khwarshi		Russian SSR	Definitely endangered
Northeast Caucasian > Tsezic	Hinuq		Russian SSR	Definitely endangered
Uralic > Finno-Permic > Balto-Finnic > Northern	Veps		Karelo-Finnish SSR, Russian SSR	Severely endangered
Uralic > Finno-Permic > Balto-Finnic > Northern > Finnish	Finnish	Karelo-Finnish SSR	Karelo-Finnish SSR, Russian SSR	Safe
Uralic > Finno-Permic > Balto-Finnic > Northern	Siberian Ingrian Finnish		Russian SSR	
Uralic > Finno-Permic > Balto-Finnic > Northern > Old Karelian	Karelian	Karelo-Finnish SSR	Karelo-Finnish SSR, Russian SSR	Definitely endangered
Uralic > Finno-Permic > Balto-Finnic > Northern > Old Karelian	Ingrian		Russian SSR, Karelo-Finnish SSR, Byelorussian SSR, Ukrainian SSR, Estonian SSR, Kazakh SSR	Severely endangered
Uralic > Finno-Permic > Balto-Finnic > Northern > Old Karelian	Ludic		Karelo-Finnish SSR, Russian SSR	
Uralic > Finno-Permic > Balto-Finnic > Southern	Votic		Karelo-Finnish SSR, Russian SSR	Critically endangered
Uralic > Finno-Permic > Balto-Finnic > Southern	Livonian		Latvian SSR	Critically endangered
Uralic > Finno-Permic > Balto-Finnic > Southern > North Estonian	Estonian	Estonian SSR	Estonian SSR	Safe
Uralic > Finno-Permic > Balto-Finnic > Southern > South Estonian	Võro		Estonian SSR	Endangered/unsafe
Uralic > Finno-Permic > Balto-Finnic > Southern > South Estonian	Seto dialect		Estonian SSR	
Uralic > Finno-Permic > Sámi > Mainland	Akkala Sámi		Russian SSR	Extinct
Uralic > Finno-Permic > Sámi > Mainland	Skolt Sámi		Russian SSR	Critically endangered
Uralic > Finno-Permic > Sámi > Peninsular	Kildin Sámi		Russian SSR	Severely endangered
Uralic > Finno-Permic > Sámi > Peninsular	Ter Sámi		Russian SSR	Critically endangered
Uralic > Finno-Permic > Permic	Udmurt	Udmurt ASSR	Russian SSR, Ukrainian SSR, Estonian SSR, Kazakh SSR	Definitely endangered
Uralic > Finno-Permic > Permic > Komi	Komi-Zyrian	Komi ASSR	Russian SSR	Potentially vulnerable
Uralic > Finno-Permic > Permic > Komi	Komi-Permyak	Komi-Permyak Autonomous Okrug	Russian SSR	Endangered/unsafe
Uralic > Finno-Permic > Permic > Komi	Komi-Yazva		Russian SSR	Severely endangered
Uralic > Finno-Permic > Permic > Mari	Mari	Mari ASSR	Russian SSR	Potentially vulnerable
Uralic > Mordvinic	Erzya	Mordovian ASSR	Russian SSR	Definitely endangered
Uralic > Mordvinic	Moksha	Mordovian ASSR	Russian SSR	Endangered/unsafe
Uralic > Samoyedic	Nganasan		Russian SSR	Severely endangered
Uralic > Samoyedic > Enets-Nenets	Tundra Nenets	Nenets AO Yamalo-Nenets AO	Russian SSR	Definitely endangered
Uralic > Samoyedic > Enets-Nenets	Forest Nenets		Russian SSR	Severely endangered
Uralic > Samoyedic > Enets-Nenets	Enets		Russian SSR	Critically endangered
Uralic > Samoyedic > Kamassian-Selkup	Selkup		Russian SSR	Definitely endangered
Uralic > Samoyedic > Kamassian-Selkup	Kamassian		Russian SSR	Extinct
Uralic > Ugric > Khanty	Salekhard (Northern) Khanty		Russian SSR	Severely endangered
Uralic > Ugric > Khanty	Surgut (Eastern) Khanty		Russian SSR	Critically endangered
Uralic > Ugric > Khanty	Southern Khanty		Russian SSR	Extinct
Uralic > Ugric > Mansi	Central Mansi		Russian SSR	Severely endangered
Uralic > Ugric > Mansi	Northern Mansi		Russian SSR	Definitely endangered
Uralic > Ugric > Mansi	Southern Mansi		Russian SSR	Extinct
Uralic > Ugric	Hungarian		Ukrainian SSR	Safe
Turkic > Oghuric	Chuvash	Chuvash ASSR	Russian SSR	Potentially vulnerable
Turkic > Common Turkic > Kipchak > Kipchak-Bulgar	Tatar	Tatar ASSR	Russian SSR, Byelorussian SSR, Ukrainian SSR, Kazakh SSR, Kirghiz SSR	Potentially vulnerable
Turkic > Common Turkic > Kipchak > Kipchak-Bulgar	Bashkir	Bashkir ASSR	Russian SSR	Potentially vulnerable
Turkic > Common Turkic > Kipchak > Kipchak-Cuman	Crimean Tatar	Crimean ASSR	Russian SSR, Byelorussian SSR, Ukrainian SSR, Uzbek SSR, Kirghiz SSR	Severely endangered
Turkic > Common Turkic > Kipchak > Kipchak-Cuman	Karachay-Balkar	Kabardino-Balkarian ASSR Karachay-Cherkess AO	Russian SSR	Potentially vulnerable
Turkic > Common Turkic > Kipchak > Kipchak-Cuman	Kumyk	Dagestan ASSR	Russian SSR, Ukrainian SSR, Byelorussian SSR, Kazakh SSR, Uzbek SSR	Potentially vulnerable
Turkic > Common Turkic > Kipchak > Kipchak-Cuman	Urum		Ukrainian SSR, Georgian SSR	Definitely endangered
Turkic > Common Turkic > Kipchak > Kipchak-Cuman	Karaim		Russian SSR, Ukrainian SSR, Lithuanian SSR	Critically endangered
Turkic > Common Turkic > Kipchak > Kipchak-Cuman	Krymchak		Russian SSR, Ukrainian SSR	Critically endangered
Turkic > Common Turkic > Kipchak > Kipchak-Nogai	Nogai	Dagestan ASSR Karachay-Cherkess AO	Russian SSR, Ukrainian SSR, Kazakh SSR, Uzbek SSR	Definitely endangered
Turkic > Common Turkic > Kipchak > Kipchak-Nogai	Karakalpak	Karakalpak ASSR	Kazakh SSR, Uzbek SSR, Turkmen SSR	Potentially vulnerable
Turkic > Common Turkic > Kipchak > Kipchak-Nogai	Kazakh	Kazakh SSR	Kazakh SSR	Potentially vulnerable
Turkic > Common Turkic > Kipchak > Kipchak-Nogai	Siberian Tatar		Russian SSR	Endangered/unsafe
Turkic > Common Turkic > Kipchak > Kipchak-Kyrgyz	Kyrgyz	Kirghiz SSR	Kirghiz SSR	
Turkic > Common Turkic > Kipchak > Kipchak-Kyrgyz	Fergana		Uzbek SSR, Kirghiz SSR, Tajik SSR	Extinct
Turkic > Common Turkic > Kipchak > Kipchak-Kyrgyz	Southern Altai	Gorno-Altai AO	Russian SSR	Definitely endangered
Turkic > Common Turkic > Karluk > Old	Chagatai			Extinct
Turkic > Common Turkic > Karluk > Western	Uzbek	Uzbek SSR	Uzbek SSR	Safe
Turkic > Common Turkic > Karluk > Eastern	Uighur		Uzbek SSR, Kirghiz SSR, Tajik SSR	Potentially vulnerable
Turkic > Common Turkic > Karluk > Eastern	Ili Turki		Kazakh SSR	Critically endangered
Turkic > Common Turkic > Oghuz > Eastern	Turkmen	Turkmen SSR	Turkmen SSR	Potentially vulnerable
Turkic > Common Turkic > Oghuz > Western	Azerbaijani	Azerbaijan SSR; Dagestan ASSR	Azerbaijan SSR	Potentially vulnerable
Turkic > Common Turkic > Oghuz > Western	Karapapakh		Georgian SSR, Russian SSR, Kazakh SSR, Azerbaijan SSR	
Turkic > Common Turkic > Oghuz > Western	Turkish (Meskhetian Dialect)		Russian SSR, Ukrainian SSR, Georgian SSR, Azerbaijan SSR, Kazakh SSR, Uzbek SSR, Kirghiz SSR	
Turkic > Common Turkic > Oghuz > Western	Gagauz		Moldavian SSR, Ukrainian SSR	Potentially vulnerable
Turkic > Siberian Turkic > North	Yakut	Yakut ASSR	Russian SSR	
Turkic > Siberian Turkic > North	Dolgan		Russian SSR	Definitely endangered
Turkic > Siberian Turkic > South	Chulym		Russian SSR	Severely endangered
Turkic > Siberian Turkic > South > Sayan	Soyot		Russian SSR	
Turkic > Siberian Turkic > South > Sayan	Tuvan	Tuvan ASSR	Russian SSR	
Turkic > Siberian Turkic > South > Sayan	Tofa		Russian SSR	
Turkic > Siberian Turkic > South >Yenisei	Northern Altai		Russian SSR	Definitely endangered
Turkic > Siberian Turkic > South >Yenisei	Khakas	Khakas AO	Russian SSR	Definitely endangered
Turkic > Siberian Turkic > South >Yenisei	Shor		Russian SSR	Severely endangered
Afro-Asiatic > Semitic	Central Asian Arabic		Uzbek SSR, Tajik SSR	Definitely endangered
Afro-Asiatic > Semitic	Shirvani Arabic †			Extinct
Afro-Asiatic > Semitic	Neo-Aramaic		Armenian SSR, Georgian SSR, Azerbaijan SSR	Safe
Mongolic > Central Mongolic	Buryat	Buryat ASSR	Russian SSR	
Mongolic > Central Mongolic	Khamnigan Mongol		Russian SSR	
Mongolic > Central Mongolic	Mongolian		Russian SSR	Potentially vulnerable
Mongolic > Central Mongolic > Kalmyk-Oirat	Kalmyk	Kalmyk ASSR	Russian SSR	Definitely endangered
Mongolic > Central Mongolic > Kalmyk-Oirat	Oirat		Kirghiz SSR	
Tungusic > Ewenic	Evenki		Russian SSR	Definitely endangered
Tungusic > Ewenic	Even		Russian SSR	Severely endangered
Tungusic > Ewenic	Kili		Russian SSR	Severely endangered
Tungusic > Ewenic	Negidal		Russian SSR	Severely endangered
Tungustic > Nanaic	Nanai		Russian SSR	Definitely endangered
Tungustic > Nanaic	Uilta		Russian SSR	
Tungustic > Nanaic	Ulch		Russian SSR	Critically endangered
Tungustic > Udegheic	Oroch		Russian SSR	Severely endangered
Tungustic > Udegheic	Udege		Russian SSR	
Chukotko-Kamchatkan > Chukotkan	Chukchi	Chukotka AO	Russian SSR	Definitely endangered
Chukotko-Kamchatkan > Chukotkan	Koryak		Russian SSR	Definitely endangered
Chukotko-Kamchatkan > Chukotkan	Alyutor		Russian SSR	Critically endangered
Chukotko-Kamchatkan > Chukotkan	Kerek		Russian SSR	Extinct
Chukotko-Kamchatkan > Kamchatkan	Itelmen		Russian SSR	Severely endangered
Chukotko-Kamchatkan > Kamchatkan	Eastern Kamchadal		Russian SSR	Extinct
Language Isolate	Nivkh		Russian SSR	Severely endangered
Yukaghir	Tundra Yukaghir		Russian SSR	Critically endangered
Yukaghir	Southern Yukaghir		Russian SSR	Critically endangered
Inuit-Aleut	Aleut		Russian SSR	Definitely endangered
Inuit-Aleut > Eskimoan	Sirenik		Russian SSR	Extinct
Inuit-Aleut > Eskimoan > Yupik	Siberian Yupik		Russian SSR	Definitely endangered
Inuit-Aleut > Eskimoan > Yupik	Naukan		Russian SSR	Definitely endangered
Yeniseian	Ket		Russian SSR	Definitely endangered
Language isolate	Ainu		Russian SSR	Extinct in Russia, critically endangered in Japan
Sino-Tibetan	Dungan		Russian SSR, Kazakh SSR, Uzbek SSR	Endangered/unsafe
Sino-Tibetan	Mandarin (Taz Dialect)		Russian SSR	Extinct
Koreanic	Korean (Koryo-Mar Dialect)		Uzbek SSR, Kazakh SSR, Turkmen SSR, Russian SSR, Ukrainian SSR	
Dravidian	Brahui		Turkmen SSR	Potentially vulnerable

Indo-European Languages

- Slavic
  - East Slavic
    - Russian
    - Ruthenian
      - Ukrainian
      - Belarusian
      - Rusyn
    - Mixed
      - Surzyk
      - Transianka
  - West Slavic
    - Lechitic
      - Polish
    - Czech-Slovak
      - Slovak
  - South Slavic
    - Eastern South Slavic
      - Bulgarian
- Baltic
  - East Baltic
    - Latvian
      - Latgalian
    - Lithuanian
      - Samogitian
- Germanic
  - North Germanic
    - East Scandinavian
      - Swedish
        - Estonian Swedish
          - Gammalsvenska
    - West Scandinavian
      - Norwegian
  - West Germanic
    - North Sea Germanic
      - Low German
        - Plautdietsch
    - Elbe Germanic
      - High German
        - Rhine Franconian
          - Volga German
        - Yiddish (Mixed)
          - Eastern Yiddish
- Romance
  - Eastern Romance
    - Romanian
      - Moldovan
  - Italo-Dalmatian
    - Italian
- Albanoid
  - Albanian
- Hellenic
  - Pontic Greek
  - Mariupol Greek
- Armenian
  - Eastern Armenian
    - Zok
  - Western Armenian
    - Homshetsi
  - Lomavren (Mixed)
- Iranian
  - West Iranian
    - Southwestern
      - Persian
        - Tajik
          - Bukharian (Mixed)
        - Tat
          - Juhuri (Mixed)
        - Persian Kowli (Mixed)
    - Northwestern
      - Caspian
        - Talysh
      - Kurdish
        - Kurmanji
  - East Iranian
    - Scythian
      - Ossetian
        - Iron Ossetian
        - Digor Ossetian
      - Yaughnobi
      - Wakhi
    - Sanglechi–Ishkashimi
      - Sanglechi
      - Ishkashimi
    - Shughni–Yazghulami
      - Shugni
      - Yazghulami
      - Rushani
      - Bartangi
      - Khufi
- Indo-Aryan
  - Central Indo-Aryan
    - Domari
      - Garachi
    - Western Hindi
      - Parya
  - Romani
    - Balkan Romani
      - Crimean Kyrymitika Romani
      - Ursari Romani
    - Baltic Romani
      - Estonian Čuxny Romani
      - Latvian Lettish Romani
      - North Russian Romani
      - Lithuanian Romani
      - Belarusian Romani
    - Vlax Romani
      - Ukrainian Vlax Romani
      - Russian Kalderaš Romani

Northwest Caucasian Language Family

- Abaza-Abkhaz
  - Abaza
  - Abkhaz
- Ubykh-Circassian
  - Ubykh †
  - Circassian
    - Kabardian
    - Adyghe

Kartvelian Languages

- Svan
- Karto-Zan
  - Georgian
    - Judeo-Georgian
  - Zan
    - Laz
    - Mingrelian

Northeast Caucasian Languages

- Lak
- Khinalug
- Avar-Andic
  - Avar
  - Andic
    - Andi (Qwannab)
    - Akhvakh–Tindi
      - Akhvakh
      - Karata–Tindi
        - Karata (Kirdi)
        - Botlikh–Tindi
          - Botlikh
          - Godoberi
          - Chamalal
          - Bagvalal–Tindi
            - Bagvalal
            - Tindi
- Tsezic
  - Tsez–Hinukh
    - Tsez
    - Hinukh
  - Bezhta–Hunzib–Khwarshi
    - Bezhta
    - Hunzib
    - Khwarshi
- Nakh
  - Bats
  - Vainakh
    - Chechen
    - Ingush
- Lezgic
  - Archi
  - Samur
    - West Samur
      - Tsakhur
      - Rutul
    - East Samur
      - Udi
      - Lezgian
      - Aghul
      - Tabasaran
    - South Samur
      - Kryts
      - Budukh
- Dargin
  - Chirag
  - Kubachi
  - North-Central Dargwa
    - Megeb
    - North Dargwa
      - Cudaxar
      - Gapshin-Butrin
      - Kadarskij
      - Muirin
        - Dejbuk
        - Xarbuk
      - Nuclear North Dargwa
        - Aqusha-Uraxi
          - Akusha
          - Uraxa
        - Mugin
        - Murego-Gubden
        - Upper Mulebki
  - South Dargwa
    - Kajtak
    - Southwestern Dargwa
      - Amuzgu-Shiri
      - Sanzhi-Icari
        - Icari
        - Sanzhi
      - Sirhwa-Tanty
      - Upper-Vurqri
        - Amux
        - Khuduts
        - Qunqi

Uralic Languages

- Ugric
  - Khanty
    - Northern Khanty
    - Southern Khanty †
    - Eastern Khanty
  - Mansi
    - Southern Mansi †
    - Core Mansi
      - Northern Mansi
      - Eastern Mansi †
      - Western Mansi †
  - Hungarian
- Samoyedic
  - Nganasan
  - Core-Samoyedic
    - Enets-Nenets
      - Enets
        - Tundra Enets
        - Forest Enets
      - Nenets
        - Tundra Nenets
        - Forest Nenets
    - Kamas-Selkup
      - Selkup
        - Taz (Northern Selkup)
        - Tym (Central Selkup)
        - Ket (Southern Selkup)
      - Kamas †
- Finno-Permic
  - Permic
    - Udmurt
    - Komi-Zyran
    - Komi-Yazva
    - Komi-Permyak
  - Balto-Finnic
    - Northern Balto-Finnic
      - Veps
      - Old Karelian
        - Ingrian
        - Ludic
        - Karelian
          - Livvi-Karelian
      - Finnish
        - Eastern Dialects
          - Savo Finnish
          - Ingrian Finnish
          - Siberian Finnish
      - Mixed
        - Siberian Ingrian Finnish
    - Southern Balto-Finnic
      - Votic
      - Livonian
      - Estonian
        - North Estonian
          - Standard Estonian
        - South Estonian
          - Võro
          - Seto
  - Sámi
    - Mainland Sámi
      - Akkala Sámi †
      - Skolt Sámi
    - Peninsular Sámi
      - Kildin Sámi
      - Ter Sámi
  - Mari
    - Eastern Mari
      - Eastern Proper Mari
      - Meadow Mari
    - Western Mari
      - Northwestern Mari
      - Hill Mari
  - Mordvinic
    - Erzya
    - Moksha

Turkic Languages

- Oghuric
  - Chuvash
- Common Turkic
  - Oghuz
    - Eastern Oghuz
      - Turkmen
    - Western Oghuz
      - Turkish
        - Meskhetian Turkish
      - Azerbaijani
      - Gagauz
      - Karapapakh †
  - Kipchak
    - Kipchak-Bulgar
      - Bashkir
      - Tatar
    - Kipchak-Cuman
      - Crimean Tatar
      - Karachay-Balkar
      - Kumyk
      - Karaim
      - Krymchak
      - Urum
    - Kipchak-Nogai
      - Dobrujan Tatar
      - Kazakh
      - Karakalpak
      - Nogai
    - Kipchak-Kyrgyz
      - Kyrgyz
      - Southern Altai
      - Fergana Kipchak †
  - Karluk
    - Western Karluk
      - Uzbek
    - Eastern Karluk
      - Uyghur
      - Ili Turki
    - Old Karluk
      - Chagatai †
  - Siberian Turkic
    - Northern Siberian
      - Yakut
      - Dolgan
    - Southern Siberian
      - Chulym
      - Sayan
        - Tuvan
        - Tofa
        - Soyot
        - Dukhan
      - Yenisei
        - Khakas
        - Kumandin
        - Northern Altai
        - Chelkan
        - Tubalar
        - Shor

Mongolic Languages

- Central Mongolic
  - Mongolian
  - Khamnigan Mongol
  - Buryat
  - Oirat
    - Kalmyk

Afro-Asiatic Languages

- Semitic
  - West Semitic
    - Central Semitic
      - Arabic
        - Shirvani Arabic †
        - Central Asian Arabic
          - Bukharian Central Asian Arabic
          - Kashkadarian Central Asian Arabic
      - Northwest Semitic
        - Aramaic
          - Neo-Aramaic
            - Suret
            - Bohtan Neo-Aramaic
            - Urmian Judeo-Neo-Aramaic

Tungustic Languages

- Southern Tungustic
  - Nanaic
    - Nanai
    - Uilta
    - Ulch
- Northern Tungustic
  - Udegheic
    - Oroch
    - Udege
  - Ewenic
    - Even
    - Evenki
    - Negidal
    - Kili

Chukotko-Kamchatkan Languages

- Chukotkan
  - Chukchi
  - Koryak
  - Alyutor
  - Kerek †
- Kamchatkan
  - Itelmen
  - Eastern Kamchadal †

Eskaleut Languages

- Aleut
- Eskimoan
  - Sirenik †
  - Yupik
    - Central Siberian Yupik
    - Naukan Yupik

Sino-Tibetan Languages

- Sinitic
  - Chinese
    - Mandarin
      - Central Plains Mandarin
        - Dungan
      - Northeastern Mandarin
        - Taz

Dravidian Languages

- Northern
  - Brahui

Koreanic Languages

- Korean
  - Northern
    - Northeast
      - Koryo-Mar

Yukaghir Languages

- Tundra Yukaghir
- Forrest Yukaghir

Yeniseian Languages

- Ketic
  - Ket

Ainuic Languages

- Kuril Ainu †
- Sakhalin Ainu †

Amuric Languages

- Nivkh Proper
- Nighvng
  - East Sakhalin
  - South Sakhalin

== Distribution of Russian in 1989 ==
The Russian language by ethnic group in the USSR in 1989
Ethnic group	Total (in thousands)	Speakers (in thousands)			Percentage		
Ethnic group	Total (in thousands)	L1	L2	Total	L1	L2	Total
Russians	145,155	144,836	219	145,155	99.8	0.2	100
Non-Russian	140,587	18,743	68,791	87,533	13.3	48.9	62.3
Ukrainians	44,186	8,309	24,820	33,128	18.8	56.2	75.0
Uzbeks	16,698	120	3,981	4,100	0.7	23.8	24.6
Belarusians	10,036	2,862	5,487	8,349	28.5	54.7	83.2
Kazakhs	8,136	183	4,917	5,100	2.2	60.4	62.7
Azerbaijanis	6,770	113	2,325	2,439	1.7	34.3	36.0
Tatars	6,649	1,068	4,706	5,774	16.1	70.8	86.8
Armenians	4,623	352	2,178	2,530	7.6	47.1	54.7
Tajiks	4,215	35	1,166	1,200	0.8	27.7	28.5
Georgians	3,981	66	1,316	1,382	1.7	33.1	34.7
Moldovans	3,352	249	1,805	2,054	7.4	53.8	61.3
Lithuanians	3,067	55	1,163	1,218	1.8	37.9	39.7
Turkmens	2,729	27	757	783	1.0	27.7	28.7
Kyrgyz	2,529	15	890	905	0.6	35.2	35.8
Germans	2,039	1,035	918	1,953	50.8	45.0	95.8
Chuvash	1,842	429	1,199	1,628	23.3	65.1	88.4
Latvians	1,459	73	940	1,013	5.0	64.4	69.4
Bashkirs	1,449	162	1,041	1,203	11.2	71.8	83.0
Jews	1,378	1,194	140	1,334	86.6	10.1	96.7
Mordvins	1,154	377	722	1,099	32.7	62.5	95.2
Poles	1,126	323	495	817	28.6	43.9	72.6
Estonians	1,027	45	348	393	4.4	33.9	38.2
Others	12,140	1,651	7,479	9,130	13.6	61.6	75.2
Total	285,743	163,898	68,791	232,689	57.4	24.1	81.4

== See also ==
- The Languages of the Peoples of the USSR
- Education in the Soviet Union
- Korenizatsiya
- Russification
- Languages of Russia
- Languages of Ukraine
- Languages of Belarus
- Languages of Estonia
- Languages of Moldova
- Languages of Armenia
- Languages of Azerbaijan
- Languages of Kazakhstan
- Languages of Uzbekistan
- Languages of Kyrgyzstan
- Languages of Tajikistan

== Sources ==
- Bernard Comrie. The Languages of the Soviet Union. CUP 1981. ISBN 0-521-23230-9 (hb), ISBN 0-521-29877-6 (pb)
- E. Glyn Lewis. Multilingualism in the Soviet Union: Aspects of Language Policy and Its Implementation. The Hague: Mouton Publishers, 1971.
- Языки народов СССР. 1967. Москва: Наука 5т.
