= Chukchi phonology =

Phonology of the Chukchi language

The Chukchi language is a Chukotko-Kamchatkan language spoken by around 5,000 people in Chukotka Autonomous Okrug, Russia. It contains five to six distinct vowels with vowel harmony, and fifteen consonants.

Its phonology is similar to those of other indigenous languages of the Russian Far East—namely Koryak.

== Vowels ==
Generally, Chukchi is noted to have 5 or 6 distinct vowels, with /e₁/ and /e₂/ being identical in pronunciation but behaving differently in the language's vowel harmony. A similar occurrence exists in Yup'ik Eskimo. Chukchi phonotactics are (C)V(C).

Word-finally, /e₁/ and /a/ are reduced to [ə], while other vowels may be elided.

Vowel Phonemes
	Front	Central	Back
Close	i		u
Mid	e	ə	o
Open		a	

=== Vowel harmony ===
Chukchi is notable for its vowel harmony based on vowel height, with /i, u, e₁/ belonging to the recessive group and /a, o, e₂/ belonging to the dominant group. The three-vowel pairs alternate with each other and cannot co-occur within a word.

== Consonants ==
Chukchi has 15 consonants. The language lacks voiced stops, which are only found in loanwords.

Chukchi consonant phonemes
	Bilabial	Alveolar	Retroflex	Palatal	Velar	Uvular	Glottal
Nasal	m	n			ŋ		
Stop	p	t		t͡ʃ	k	q	ʔ
Fricative	β	s			ɣ		
Lateral		ɬ					
Approximant			ɻ	j			

- /β, ɣ, ɻ, j/ are devoiced to [ɸ, x, ɻ̊, j̊] after voiceless stops.
- /ɻ/ is mostly heard as an alveolar trill [r] between vowels.
- /s/ is phonetically [s~tʃ] in free variation.
- /tʃ/ becomes [s] before /q/.
- /s, tʃ, ɻ/ have different distributions between the male and female dialects.
- /k/ is affricated to [kx] word-finally.
- /ɬ/ is voiced to [ɮ] between vowels.
- /t, p/ are unreleased [t̚, p̚] word-finally.
- /q/ may be affricated to [qχ] in some environments.

There is also a supersegmental glottalisation realised as a glottal stop preceding a vowel. It is not treated as a consonant as a result of phonotactics and reduplication patterns.
