= 1897 Russian census =

Only nation-wide census in the Russian Empire

First general census of the population of the Russian Empire in 1897
- 9 February 1897
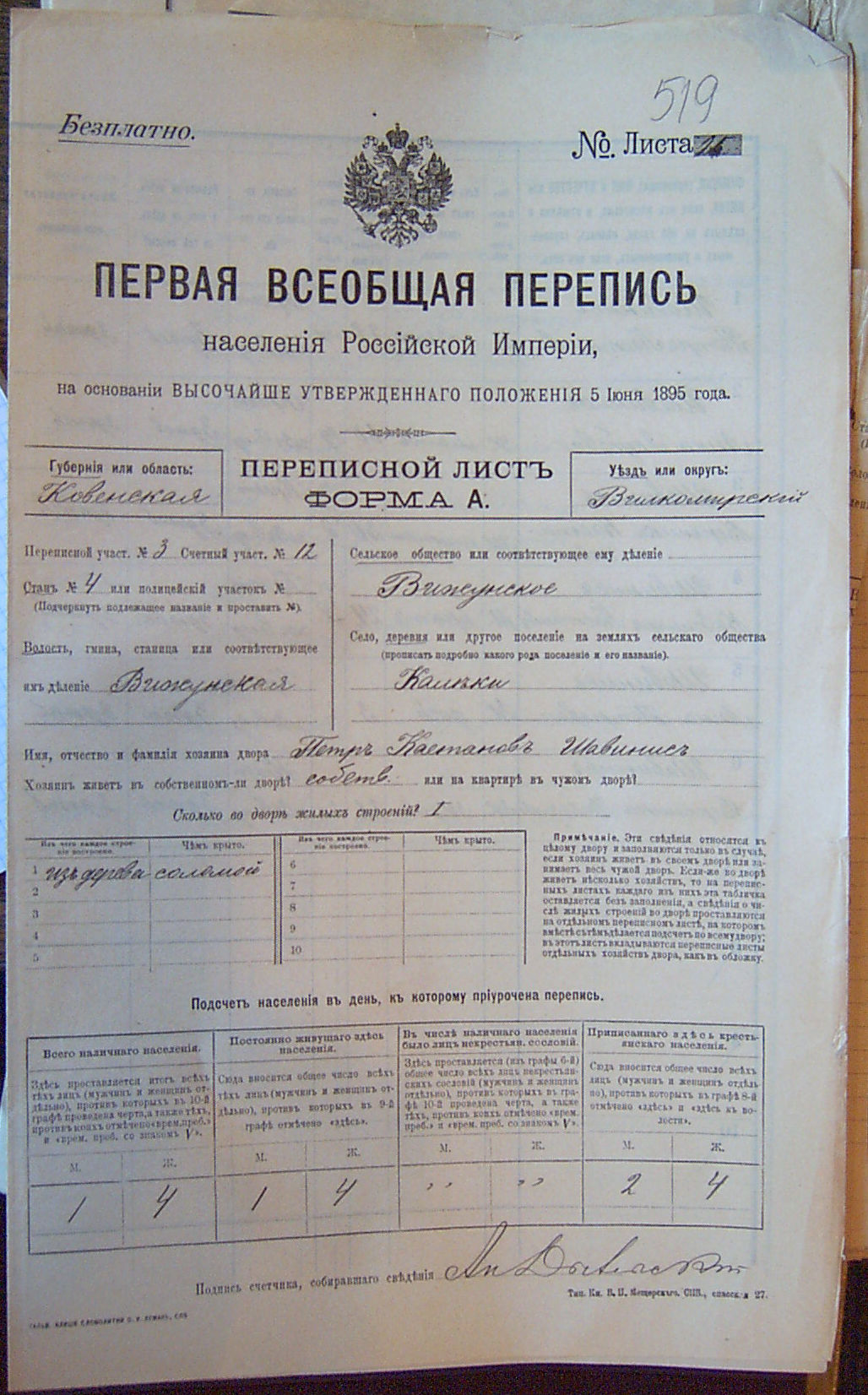
- First page of the census form from Kovno Governorate

General information
- Country: Russian Empire
- Authority: Central Statistical Bureau

Results
- Total population: 125,640,021
- Most populous governorate or oblast: Kiev Governorate (3,559,229)
- Least populous governorate or oblast: Amur Oblast (120,306)

The 1897 Russian census, formally known as the first general census of the population of the Russian Empire in 1897, (Note: Russian: Пе́рвая всео́бщая пе́репись населе́нія Россíйской импе́ріи 1897 го́да, romanized: Pervaya vseobshchaya perepis' naseleniya Rossiyskoy imperii 1897 goda, Modern Russian orthography: Пе́рвая всео́бщая пе́репись населе́ния Росси́йской импе́рии 1897 го́да) was the first and only nation-wide census performed in the Russian Empire. The census recorded demographic data as of 9 February 1897 [O.S. 28 January]; with a population of 125,640,021, it made Russia the world's third-most populated country at the time, after the British and Qing empires. Although the census was performed in most of the empire, no enumeration was done in the Grand Duchy of Finland.

The census revealed the social class, native language, religion, and profession of citizens, which were aggregated to yield district and provincial totals. The data processing took eight years; publishing the results began in 1898 and was completed in 1905. In total, 119 books in 89 volumes were published for 89 governorates in the empire, including a two-volume summary.

The next census had been planned for December 1915, but was cancelled due to World War I. It was not rescheduled before the Russian Revolution. The next census in Russia only occurred at the end of 1926, almost three decades later.

== Background ==
Previous censuses had been recorded for fiscal and military purposes. Until the eighteenth century, population records were sporadic, as in either scribal or census books. Audits began to be carried out at the beginning of the eighteenth century, and population censuses became relatively regular. Since 1858, the audit had been replaced by administrative and police registration of the population based on data from family lists. In total, three large administrative and police censuses of the population were carried out—in 1858, 1863, and 1885. Running population registrations – including births, marriages, and deaths – were carried out by religious organisations until 1918. All the items mentioned above were characterised by inaccuracy and insufficient completeness.

By 1897, significant experience had been accumulated in local, mainly urban, population censuses that had been conducted since the later half of the nineteenth century. Population censuses were performed in separate governorates (Pskov in 1870 and 1887, Astrakhan in 1873, Akmola in 1877, etc.), in which residents in all cities were enumerated. The population in the entire Courland Governorate was enumerated in 1863 and 1881, and in the governorates of Livonia and Estonia in the latter. Registration of the rural population was performed during household and other surveys of zemstvos. In 1871, under the general editorship of the professor of military statistics, Nikolai Obruchev, officers of the General Staff published a military statistical collection, the four-volume edition of which contained data on the population of Russia as a whole, and was categorised by governorates and okrugs.

In 1870, the project for an all-Russian population census was discussed at the First All-Russian Congress of Statisticians, and in 1876, at the eighth session of the International Statistical Congress. On 26 February 1877, the draft of "Regulations on the General National Census", which was developed by a commission under the Ministry of Finance, was submitted to the State Council; however, it was not discussed there, possibly due to the Russo-Turkish War that occurred from 1877 to 1878. In the early 80s of the nineteenth century, the Ministry of Internal Affairs began to receive statements from some zemstvo assemblies and governors about the need to conduct a population census as soon as possible; this was due to the unbalanced distribution of taxes among peasant families and an increase in arrears in collections from the population. After the famine of 1891–1892, the question of the obligation to have accurate figures of the population of the empire again arose.

== Organization ==
The census project was suggested during 1877 by Pyotr Semenov-Tyan-Shansky, a famous Russian geographer and director of the Central Statistical Bureau, and was approved by Czar Nicholas II in 1895.

The census was performed in two stages. For the first stage (December 1896 — January 1897) the counters (135,000 persons: teachers, priests, and literate soldiers) visited all households and filled in the questionnaires, which were verified by local census managers. For the second stage (9 January 1898 [O.S. 28 December 1897]) the counters simultaneously visited all households to verify and update the questionnaires. The census was performed during winter as the population was less mobile then. Despite this being the only imperial census, historians are able to estimate the Russian Empire's population during earlier times by collecting city censuses.

The data processing required 8 years using Hollerith card machines. Publication of the results started during 1898 and ended in 1905. In total, 119 volumes for 89 guberniyas, as well as a two-volume summary, were issued.

== Data fields ==
The questionnaire contained the following questions:

- Family name, given name, patronymic or nickname (прозвище)
- Sex
- Relation with respect to the head of the family or household
- Age
- Marital status
- Social status: sosloviye (estate of the realm), rank or title (сословіе, состояніе, званіе)
- Place of birth
- Place of registration
- Usual place of residence
- Notice of absence
- Faith
- First language (родной язык)
- Literacy
- Occupation (profession, trade, position of office or service), both primary and secondary

In the census summary tables, nationality was based on the declared primary language of respondents.

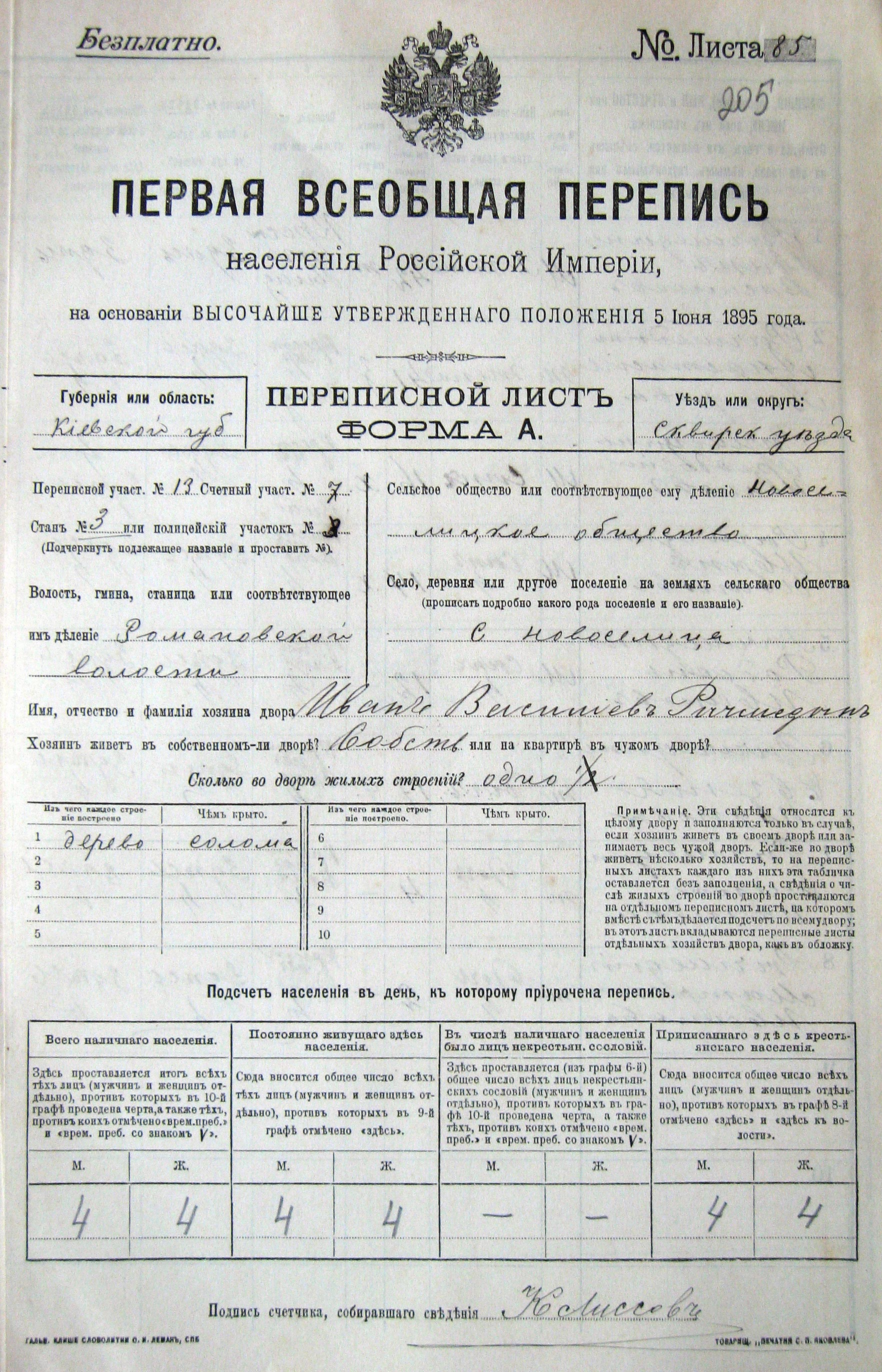
The first page of a census form from Kiev Governorate.

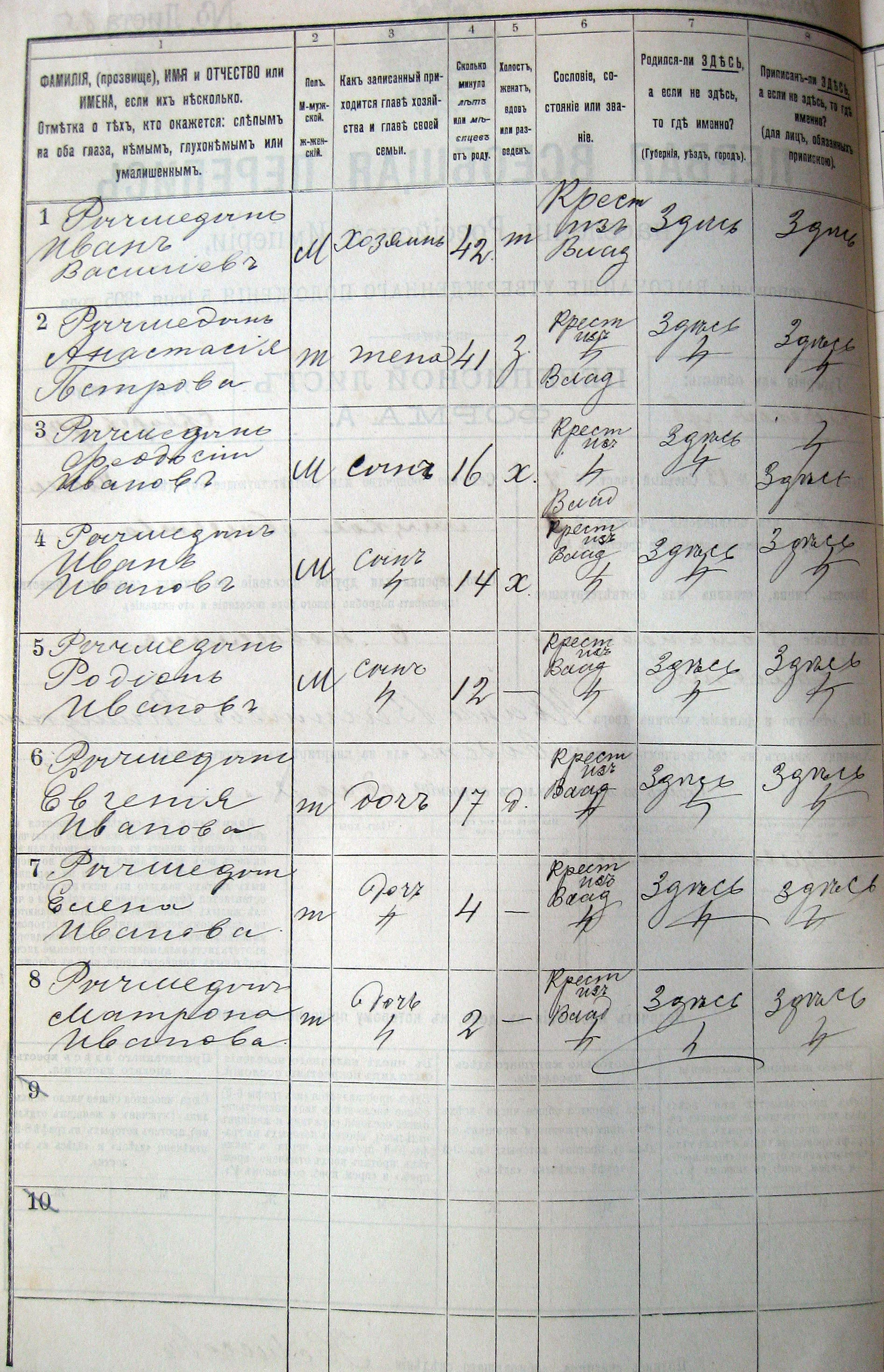
The second page of a census form from Kiev Governorate.

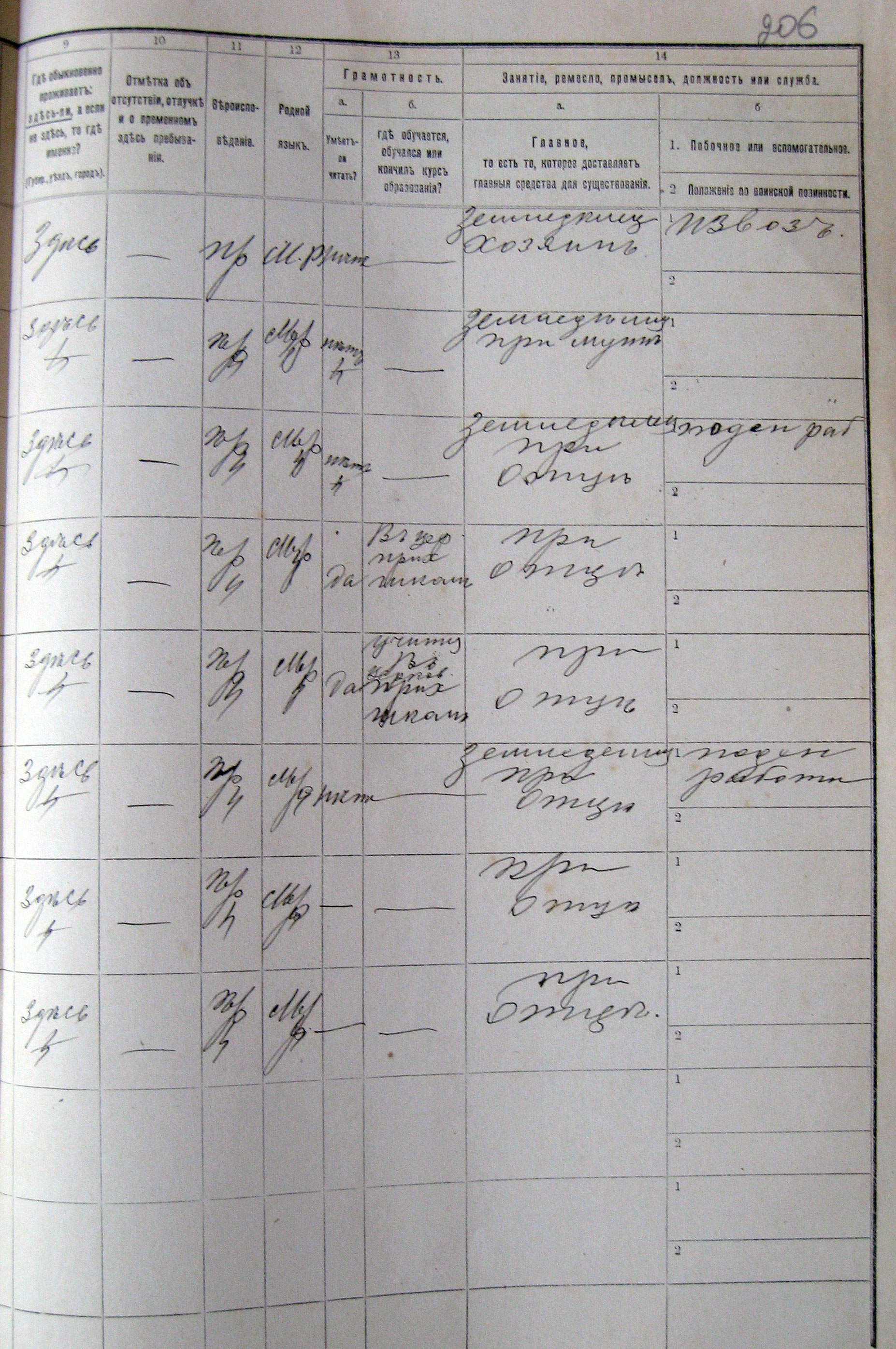
The third page of a census form from Kiev Governorate.

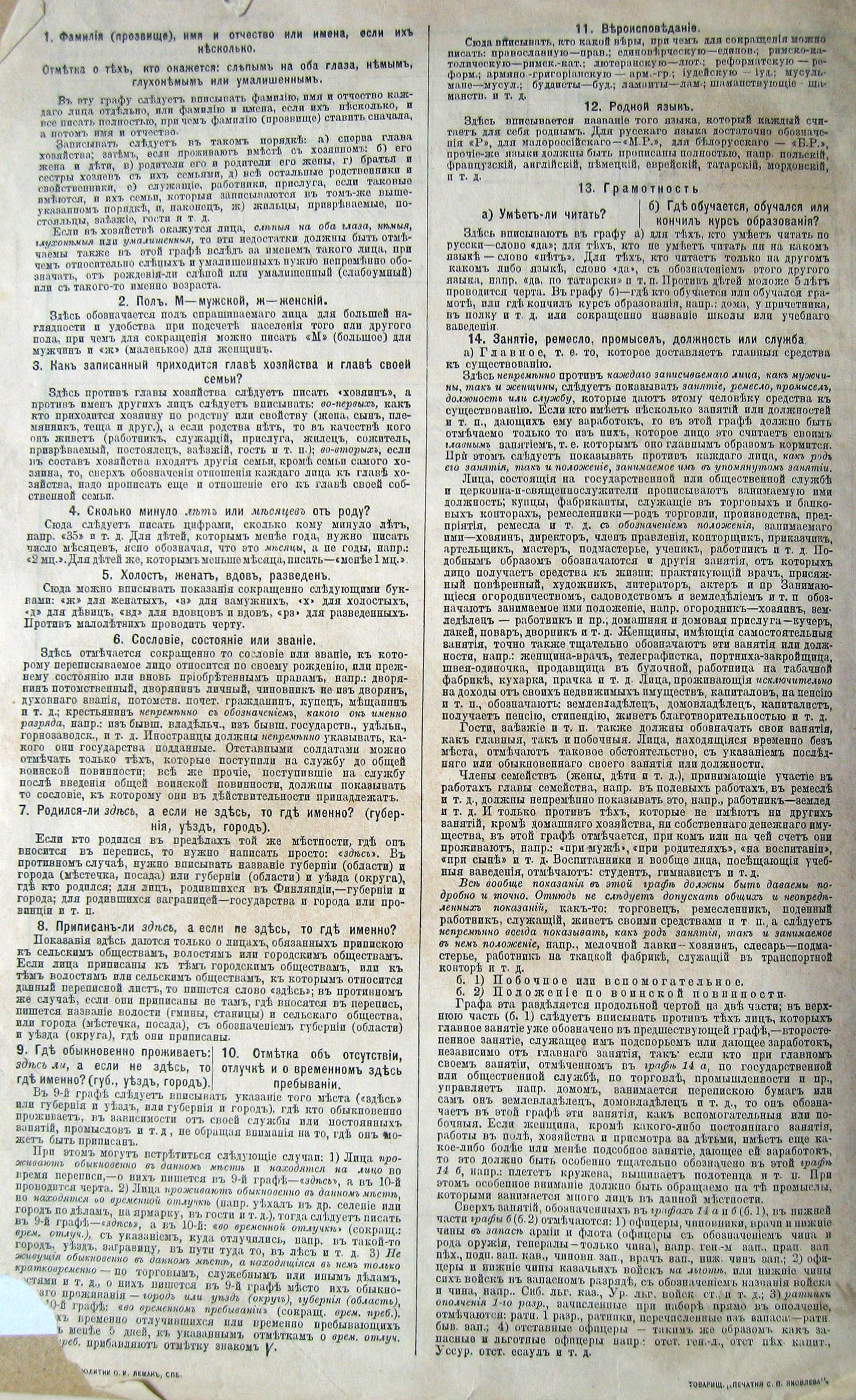
A description page for a census form from Kiev Governorate.

== Census results ==
The total population of the Russian Empire was recorded to be 125,640,021 people, 62,477,348 or 49.73% of whom were men and 63,162,673 or 50.27% were women—the median age was 21.16 years.

=== By native language ===
Map of subdivisions of the Russian Empire by largest ethnolinguistic group (1897)

Linguistic composition of the Russian Empire
Language	Urban		Rural		TOTAL	
Language	Native speakers	%	Native speakers	%	Native speakers	%
Great Russian (Note: Termed as Russians: Great Russian (Великорусский). Today known as Russian.)	8,825,733	52.45	46,841,736	43.05	55,667,469	44.31
Little Russian (Note: Termed as Russians: Little Russian (Малорусский). Today known as Ukrainian.)	1,256,387	7.47	21,124,164	19.41	22,380,551	17.81
Polish	1,455,527	8.65	6,475,780	5.95	7,931,307	6.31
White Russian (Note: Termed as Russians: White Russian (Белорусский). Today known as Belarusian.)	171,383	1.02	5,714,164	5.25	5,885,547	4.68
Jewish	2,502,217	14.87	2,560,939	2.35	5,063,156	4.03
Kyrgyz-Kaisak (Note: Kazakh, Karakalpak and some other smaller Central Asian languages grouped together)	46,827	0.28	4,037,312	3.71	4,084,139	3.25
Tatar (Note: Incorporates many Tatar and Turkic speaking nationalities, such as Crimean Tatar, Volga Tatar, Siberian Tatar, Azerbaijani, Balkar, Altaian, Khakas and others.)	417,727	2.48	3,319,900	3.05	3,737,627	2.97
German	418,533	2.49	1,371,956	1.26	1,790,489	1.43
Latvian	230,719	1.37	1,205,218	1.11	1,435,937	1.14
Bashkir	13,844	0.08	1,307,519	1.20	1,321,363	1.05
Lithuanian	43,136	0.26	1,167,374	1.07	1,210,510	0.96
Armenian	272,801	1.62	900,295	0.83	1,173,096	0.93
Moldovan (Note: The overwhelming part was Moldovan, the Romanian though seen as an apart language, was counted together with the Moldovan.)	64,134	0.38	1,057,535	0.97	1,121,669	0.89
Mordovian	14,022	0.08	1,009,819	0.93	1,023,841	0.81
Estonian	139,544	0.83	863,194	0.79	1,002,738	0.80
Sartic	204,046	1.21	764,609	0.70	968,655	0.77
Chuvash	6,051	0.04	837,704	0.77	843,755	0.67
Georgian	98,503	0.59	725,465	0.67	823,968	0.66
Uzbek	91,750	0.55	634,784	0.58	726,534	0.58
Samogitian	8,946	0.05	439,076	0.40	448,022	0.36
Other Turkic dialects	156,348	0.93	284,064	0.26	440,412	0.35
Votyak	2,245	0.01	418,725	0.38	420,970	0.34
Mari	2,191	0.01	373,248	0.34	375,439	0.30
Tajik	103,240	0.61	247,157	0.23	350,397	0.28
Buryat	2,038	0.01	286,625	0.26	288,663	0.23
Turkmen	2,687	0.02	278,670	0.26	281,357	0.22
Imeretian	17,181	0.10	256,005	0.24	273,186	0.22
Mingrelian	11,539	0.07	228,086	0.21	239,625	0.19
Yakut (Note: Includes Dolgan)	3,890	0.02	223,494	0.21	227,384	0.18
Chechen	871	0.01	225,625	0.21	226,496	0.18
Avar-Andean	5,533	0.03	207,159	0.19	212,692	0.17
Turkish (Note: Includes Gagauz)	13,378	0.08	195,444	0.18	208,822	0.17
Karelian	2,791	0.02	205,310	0.19	208,101	0.17
Kara-Kyrgyz (Note: Today known as Kyrgyz)	270	0.00	201,412	0.19	201,682	0.16
Kalmyk	1,263	0.01	189,385	0.17	190,648	0.15
Greek	33,621	0.20	153,304	0.14	186,925	0.15
Bulgarian	14,371	0.09	158,288	0.15	172,659	0.14
Ossetian	5,907	0.04	165,809	0.15	171,716	0.14
Kyurin	5,146	0.03	154,067	0.14	159,213	0.13
Komi	6,340	0.04	147,278	0.14	153,618	0.12
Finnish	25,610	0.15	117,458	0.11	143,068	0.11
Dargin	1,847	0.01	128,362	0.12	130,209	0.10
Teptyars	579	0.00	117,194	0.11	117,773	0.09
Permyak	366	0.00	104,325	0.10	104,691	0.08
Karakalpak	46	0.00	104,228	0.10	104,274	0.08
Kurdish	1,148	0.01	98,801	0.09	99,949	0.08
Kabardian	523	0.00	98,038	0.09	98,561	0.08
Tat	4,099	0.02	90,957	0.08	95,056	0.08
Kazi-Kumukh and other Lezgic languages	1,642	0.01	89,238	0.08	90,880	0.07
Kumyk	3,529	0.02	79,879	0.07	83,408	0.07
Abkhaz (Note: Includes Abaza)	343	0.00	71,760	0.07	72,103	0.06
Tungus	192	0.00	66,078	0.06	66,270	0.05
Nogai	299	0.00	63,781	0.06	64,080	0.05
Chinese	24,794	0.15	32,665	0.03	57,459	0.05
Taranchin Uyghur	10,789	0.06	45,680	0.04	56,469	0.04
Mishar Tatar	657	0.00	53,190	0.05	53,847	0.04
Czech and Slovak	8,375	0.05	42,010	0.04	50,385	0.04
Ingush	541	0.00	46,868	0.04	47,409	0.04
Circassian	1,660	0.01	44,626	0.04	46,286	0.04
Romani	6,551	0.04	38,031	0.03	44,582	0.04
Talysh	1,035	0.01	34,256	0.03	35,291	0.03
Persian	18,976	0.11	12,747	0.01	31,723	0.03
Karapapakh	9	0.00	29,893	0.03	29,902	0.02
Karachay	45	0.00	27,178	0.02	27,223	0.02
Korean	1,716	0.01	24,289	0.02	26,005	0.02
Chud	117	0.00	25,703	0.02	25,820	0.02
Ostyak (Khanty)	179	0.00	19,484	0.02	19,663	0.02
French	12,966	0.08	3,467	0.00	16,433	0.01
Samoyedic	127	0.00	15,750	0.01	15,877	0.01
Svan	94	0.00	15,662	0.01	15,756	0.01
Kashgar Uyghur	139	0.00	14,799	0.01	14,938	0.01
Swedish	6,969	0.04	7,230	0.01	14,199	0.01
Izhorian	37	0.00	13,737	0.01	13,774	0.01
Chukchi	8	0.00	11,787	0.01	11,795	0.01
Vogul (Mansi)	9	0.00	7,642	0.01	7,651	0.01
Kipchak	6	0.00	7,601	0.01	7,607	0.01
Udi	11	0.00	7,089	0.01	7,100	0.01
English	5,746	0.03	1,308	0.00	7,054	0.01
Gilyak (Nivkh)	14	0.00	6,180	0.01	6,194	0.00
Koryak	31	0.00	6,027	0.01	6,058	0.00
Assyrian	1,307	0.01	4,046	0.00	5,353	0.00
Italian	3,824	0.02	936	0.00	4,760	0.00
Kamchadal	6	0.00	3,972	0.00	3,978	0.00
Manchu	54	0.00	3,340	0.00	3,394	0.00
Japanese	1,855	0.01	794	0.00	2,649	0.00
Serbo-Croatian	1,197	0.01	618	0.00	1,815	0.00
Sámi	41	0.00	1,771	0.00	1,812	0.00
Arabic	93	0.00	1,603	0.00	1,696	0.00
Norwegian and Danish	1,031	0.01	609	0.00	1,640	0.00
Ainu	6	0.00	1,440	0.00	1,446	0.00
Eskimo	1	0.00	1,098	0.00	1,099	0.00
Yenisei-Ostyak (Ket)	6	0.00	988	0.00	994	0.00
Hungarian	699	0.00	262	0.00	961	0.00
Yukaghir	0	0.00	948	0.00	948	0.00
Albanian	70	0.00	866	0.00	936	0.00
Mongolian	84	0.00	733	0.00	817	0.00
Afghan	43	0.00	571	0.00	614	0.00
Aleut	338	0.00	246	0.00	584	0.00
Chuvan	190	0.00	316	0.00	506	0.00
Other Lezgic languages	165	0.00	255	0.00	420	0.00
Kist	97	0.00	316	0.00	413	0.00
Dutch	225	0.00	110	0.00	335	0.00
Hindi	236	0.00	76	0.00	312	0.00
Spanish and Portuguese	112	0.00	26	0.00	138	0.00
Other languages	69	0.00	5	0.00	74	0.00
Not indicated	2,142	0.01	2,985	0.00	5,127	0.00
TOTAL	16,828,395	100.00	108,811,626	100.00	125,640,021	100.00

For specifically the nobility, accounting for 1.8 million people, native languages were as follows: 53% Russian, 28.6% Polish, 5.9% Georgian, 5.3% Tatar, 3.4% Lithuanian, 2.4% German, 1.4% other.

=== By religion ===
Religious composition of the Russian Empire in 1897
Faith	Male	Female	Both	
Faith	Male	Female	Number	%
Eastern Orthodox	42,954,739	44,168,865	87,123,604	69.34
Muslim	7,383,293	6,523,679	13,906,972	11.07
Roman Catholic	5,686,361	5,781,633	11,467,994	9.13
Rabbinic Jewish	2,547,144	2,668,661	5,215,805	4.15
Lutherans	1,739,814	1,832,839	3,572,653	2.84
Old Believers	1,029,023	1,175,573	2,204,596	1.75
Armenian Apostolic	625,592	553,649	1,179,241	0.94
Buddhists	240,739	193,124	433,863	0.34
Reformed	42,877	42,523	85,400	0.07
Mennonite	33,598	32,966	66,564	0.05
Armenian Catholic	20,028	18,812	38,840	0.03
Baptist	18,372	19,767	38,139	0.03
Karaite Jewish	6,372	6,522	12,894	0.01
Anglican	2,042	2,141	4,183	0.00
Other Christian denominations	2,371	1,581	3,952	0.00
Other non-Christian denominations	144,983	140,338	285,321	0.23
TOTAL	62,477,348	63,162,673	125,640,021	100.00

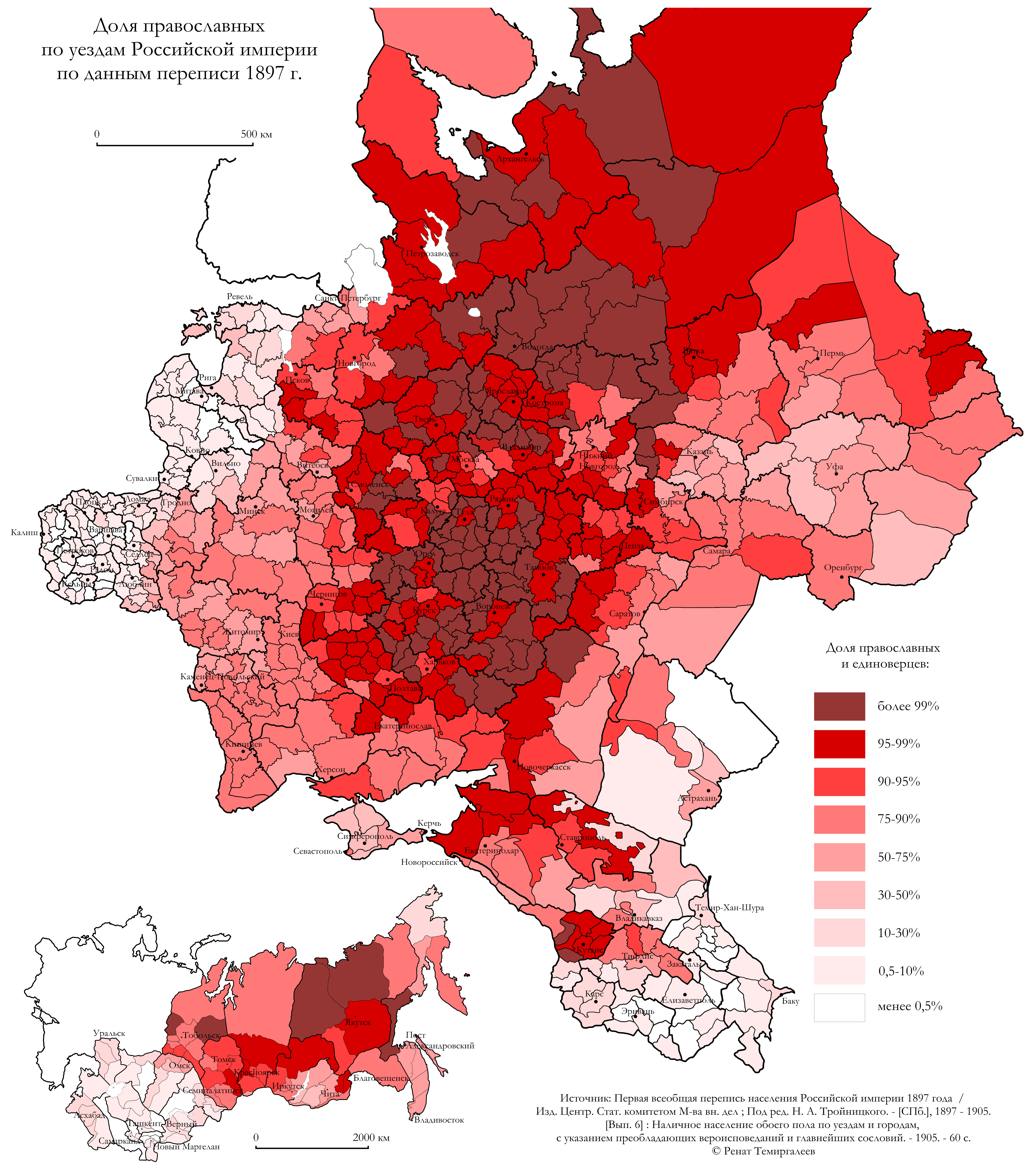
Eastern Orthodox

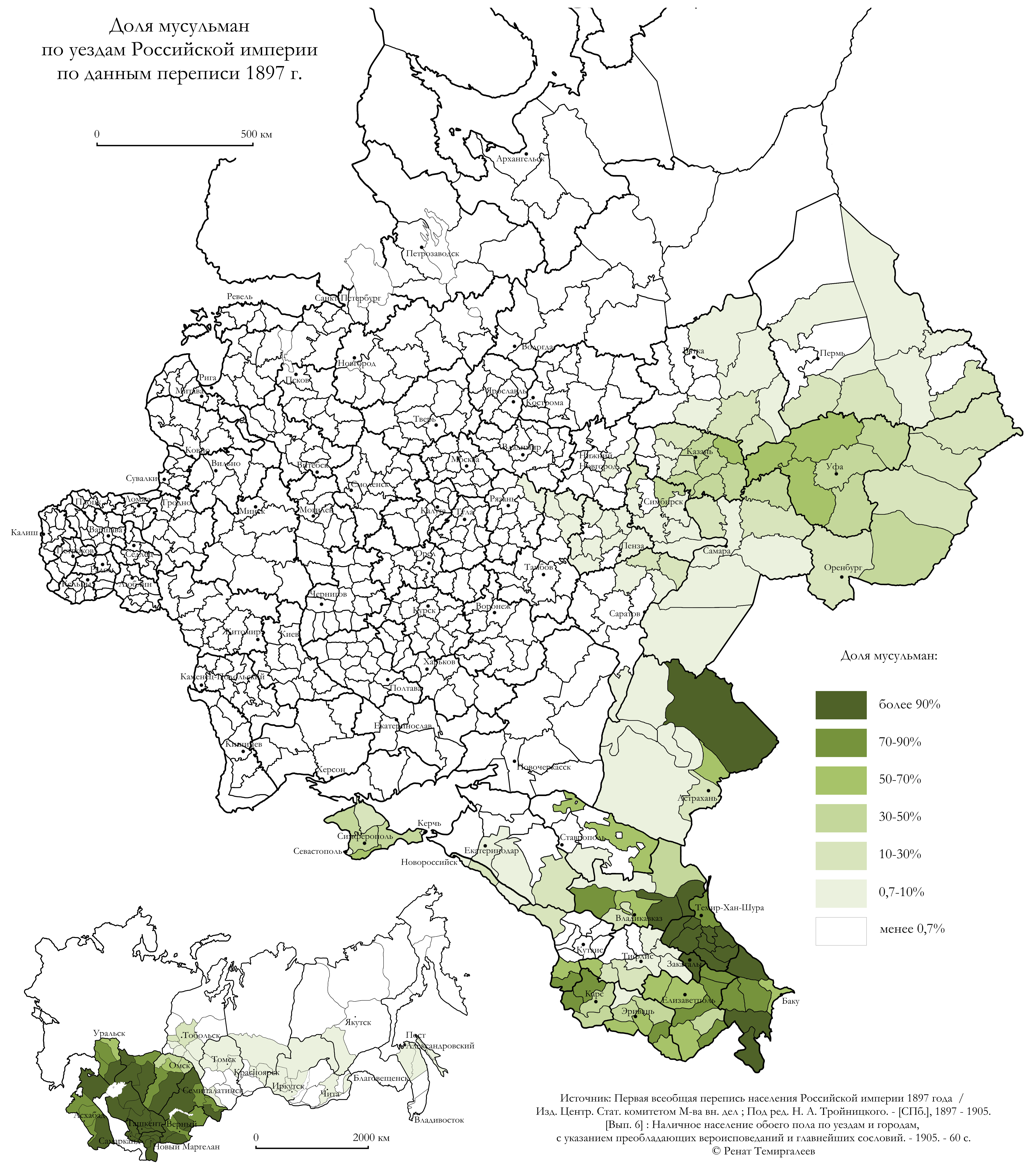
Muslims

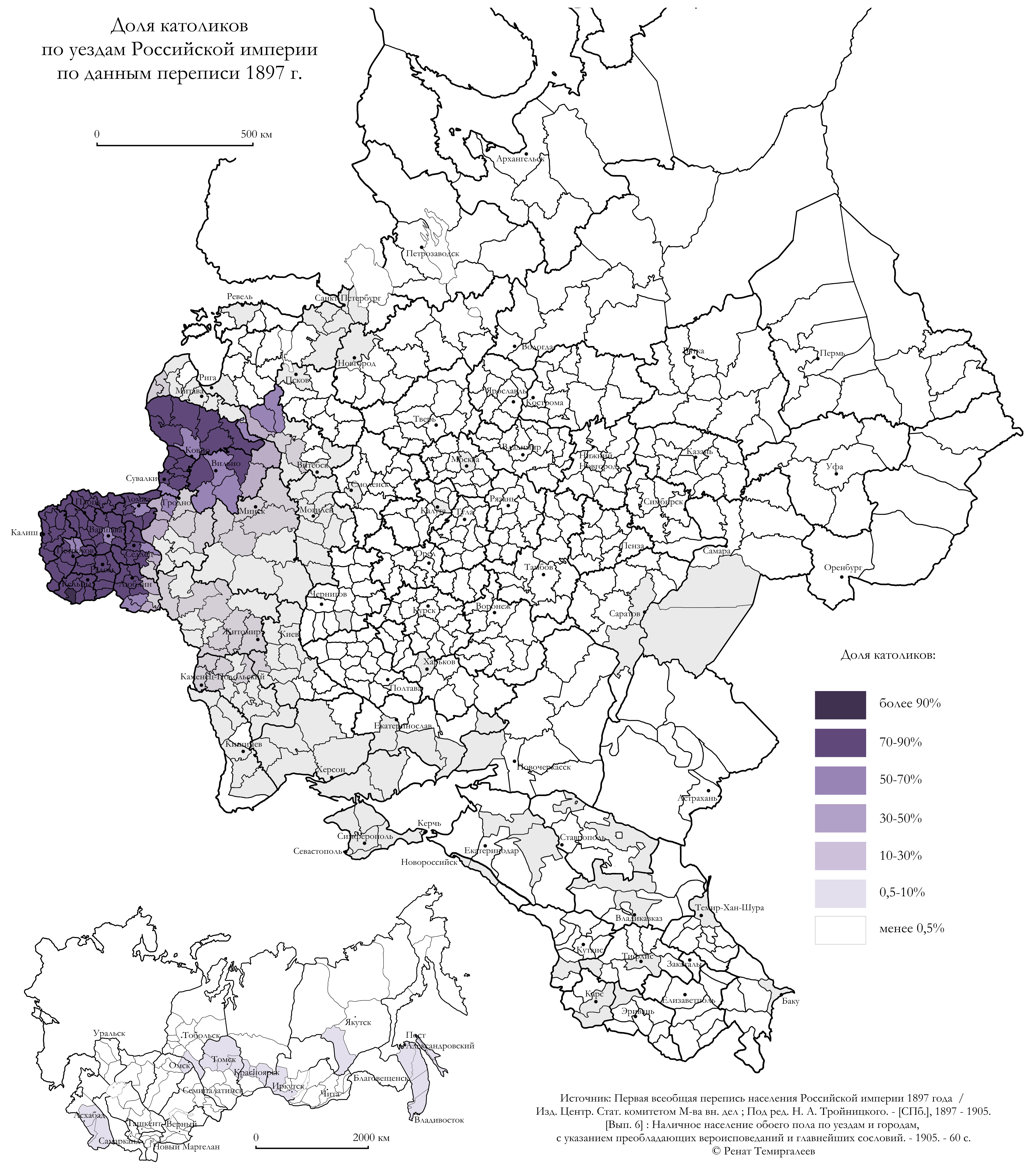
Roman Catholics

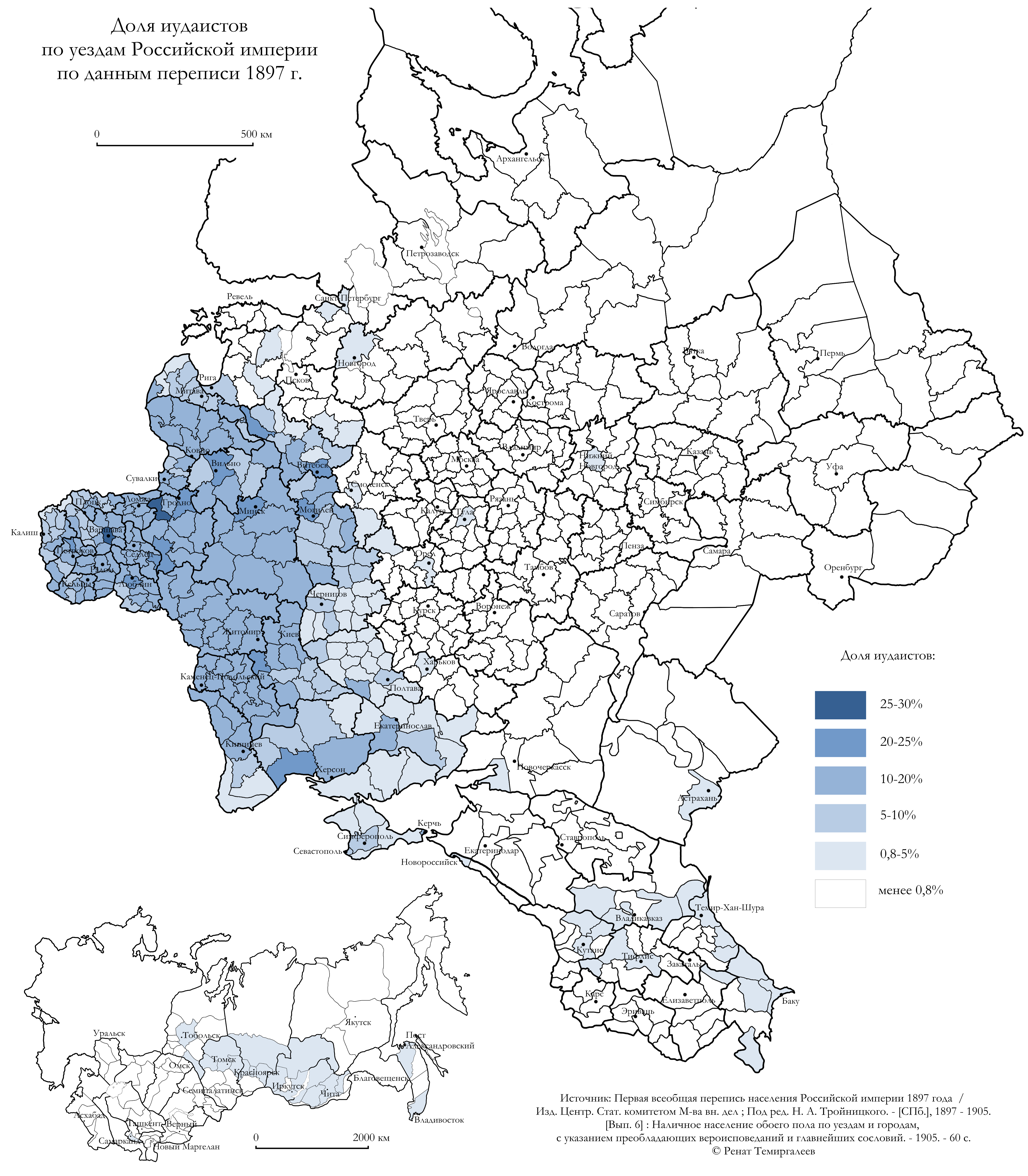
Jews

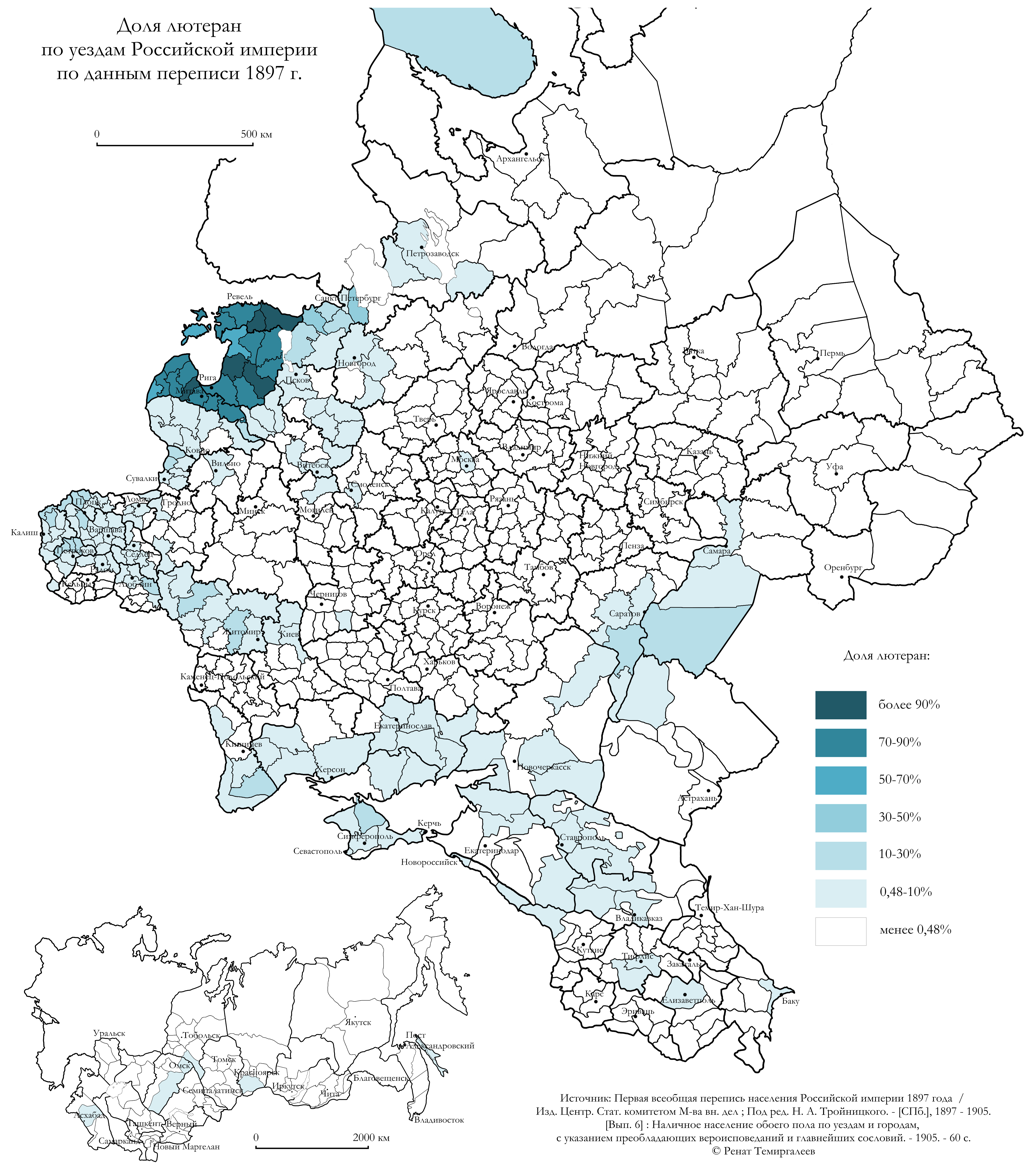
Lutherans

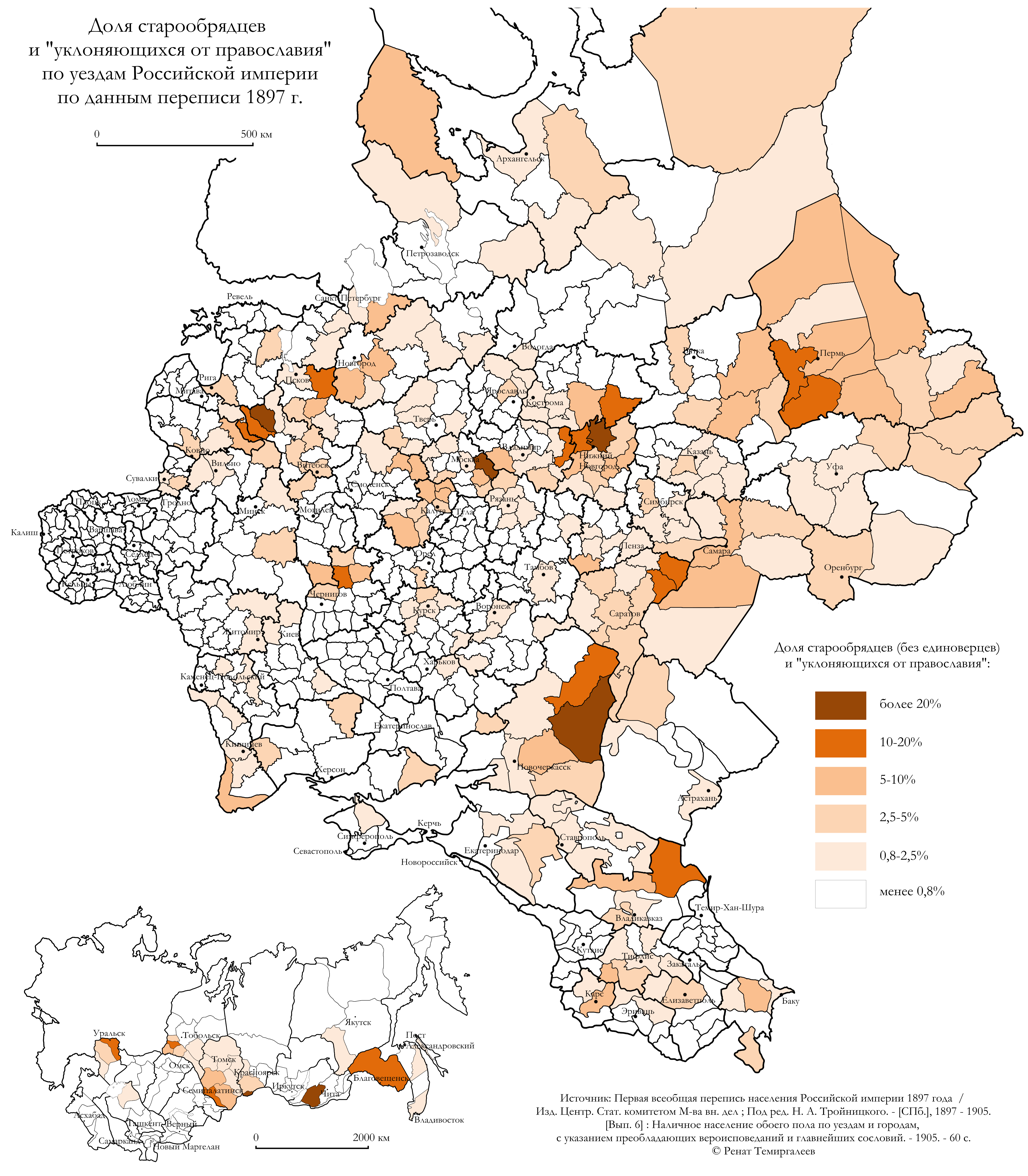
Old Believers

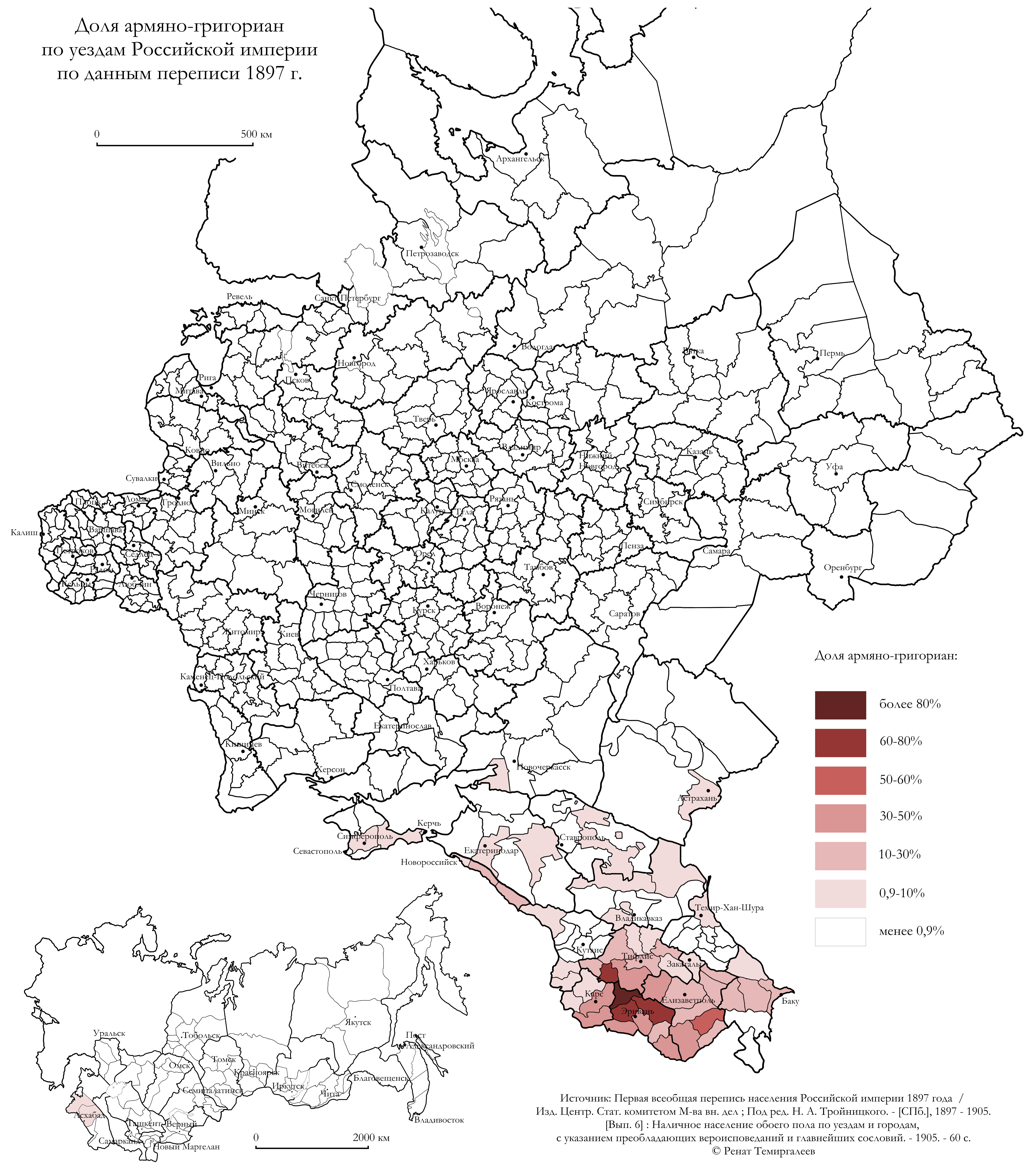
Armenian Apostolics

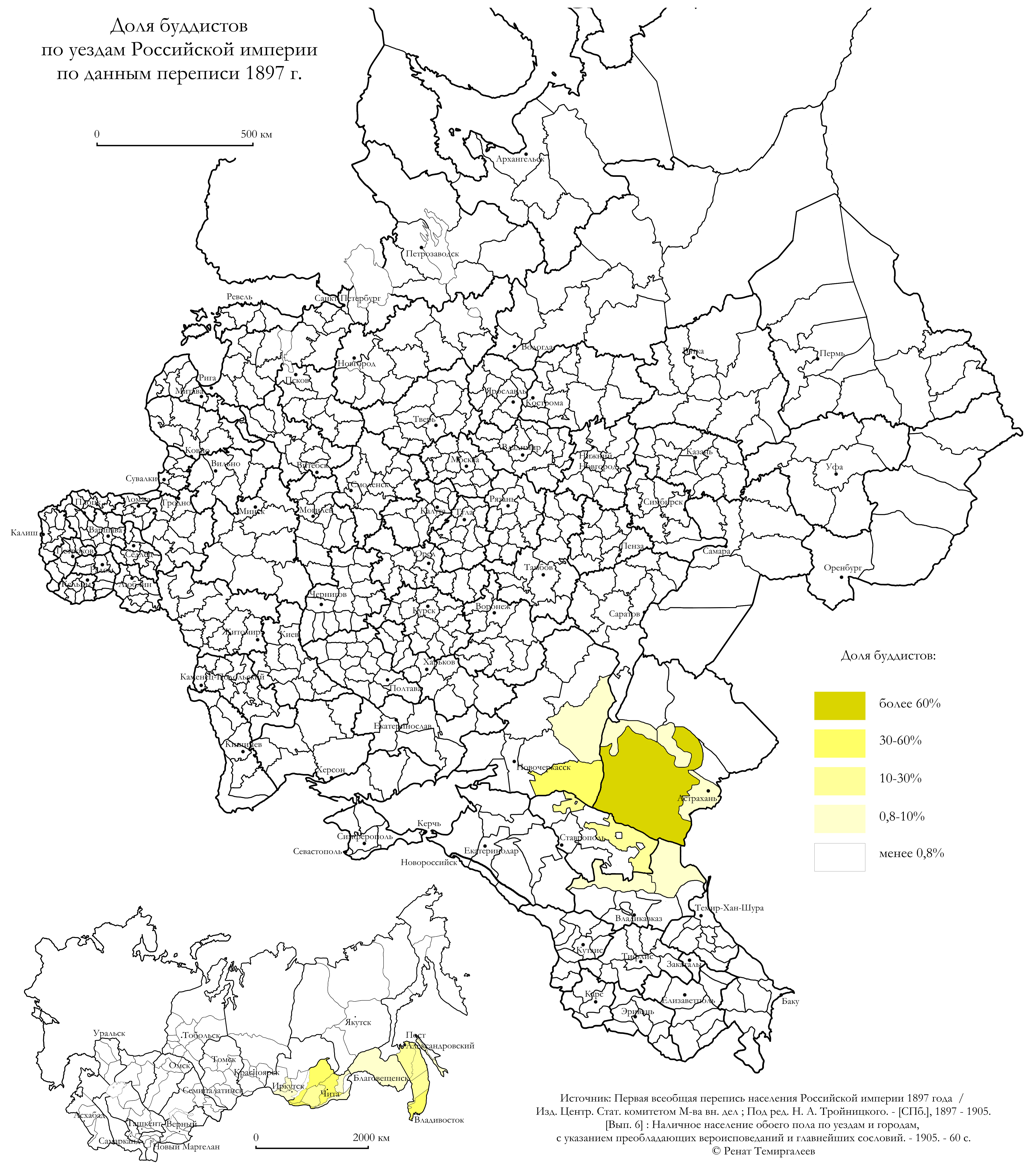
Buddhists

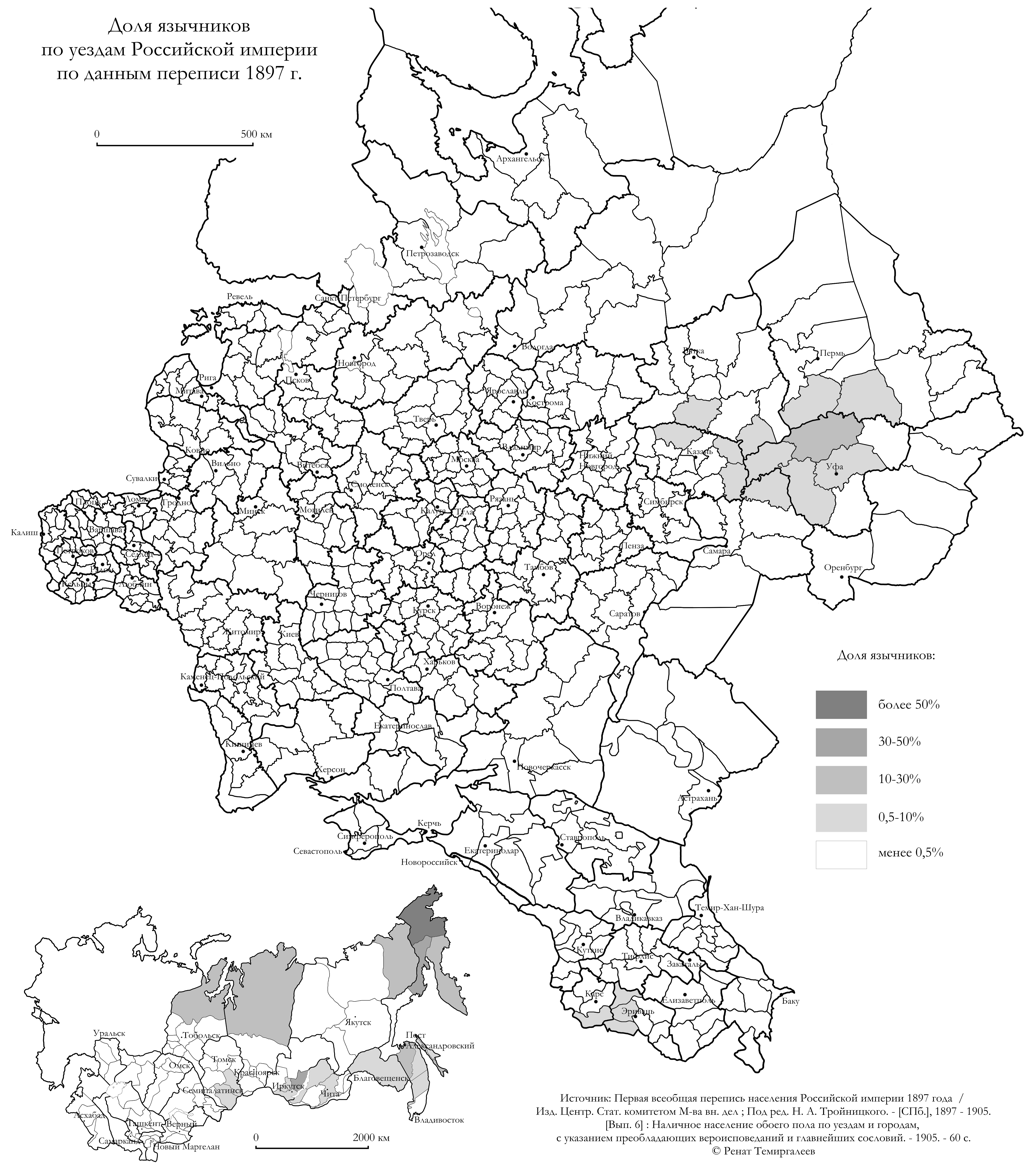
Pagans

=== Population by modern-day countries ===
- Russia 67,476,000 (from this Siberia 5,758,822)
- Ukraine 23,430,407 (from this Crimea 1,447,790; it excludes Ukraine that was not a part of Russian Empire, see Austro-Hungarian Empire)
- Poland (Vistula basin) 9,402,253
- Belarus 6,927,040
- Kazakhstan 4,000,000
- Lithuania 3,135,771
- Georgia 2,109,273
- Uzbekistan 2,000,000
- Moldova 1,935,412
- Latvia 1,929,387
- Azerbaijan 1,705,131
- Estonia 900,000
- Armenia 797,853
- Kyrgyzstan 750,000
- Tajikistan 646,000
- Turkmenistan 350,000

=== Largest cities ===
Largest cities of the Empire according to the census:

- Saint Petersburg – 1,264,900
- Moscow – 1,038,600
- Varshava (Warsaw) – 626,000
- Odessa (Odesa) – 403,800
- Lod (Łódź) – 314,000
- Riga – 282,200
- Kiev (Kyiv) – 247,700
- Kharkov (Kharkiv) – 174,000
- Tiflis (Tbilisi) – 159,600
- Vilna (Vilnius) – 154,500
- Saratov – 137,100
- Kazan – 130,000
- Rostov-on-Don – 119,500
- Tula – 114,700
- Astrakhan – 112,900
- Ekaterinoslav (Dnipro) – 112,800
- Baku – 111,900
- Chișinău – 108,500
- Helsinki – 93,000
- Nikolayev (Mykolaiv) – 92,000
- Minsk – 90,900
- Nizhny Novgorod – 90,100
- Samara – 90,000
- Orenburg – 72,400
- Yaroslavl – 71,600
- Dvinsk (Daugavpils) – 69,675
- Vitebsk – 65,900
- Reval (Tallinn) – 64 572
- Libava (Liepāja) – 64,489
- Yekaterinodar (Krasnodar) – 65,600
- Tsaritsyn (Volgograd) – 55,200

== Data availability ==
Each enumeration form was copied twice, with the three copies filed in the Volost (county) archives, the governorate archives, and the Central Statistical Bureau in St. Petersburg. The copies in St. Petersburg were destroyed after they had been tabulated. Most of the copies stored locally and regionally have also been destroyed; however, the complete census for the Arkhangelsk and Tobolsk governorates has been preserved, and the census for portions of several other governorates is also extant.

== Assessment ==
The results may have been influenced by national policy of the authorities: the population of Russian ethnicity was somewhat exaggerated. Thus for example, the number of Poles is underrepresented. Imperial officials classified the Ukrainian and Belarusian languages as belonging to the Russian group and labeled those nationalities as Little Russian for Ukrainians and White Russian for Belarusians.

The census did not contain a question on ethnicity, which was deduced from data on mother tongue, social estate and occupation. There was also a 1916 and 1917 "agricultural census" that was carried out throughout the empire (except in some parts of the Caucasus, Eastern Russia, and Siberia), and a 1920 "general census" (except in the Russian far north, far east, Ukraine, and the Caucasus).

== See also ==
- Revision list
