= Koryak =

Koryak may refer to:

- Koryaks, a people of northeastern Siberia
- Koryak language, language of the Koryaks
- Koryak Okrug, an administrative division of Kamchatka Krai, Russia
- Koryak, the son of Aquaman, a fictional character in DC Comics
