= Southern Itelmen language =

Extinct Kamchatkan language of Russia

Southern Kamchadal
- Southern Itelmen
- Native to: Russia
- Region: Kamchatka Peninsula
- Ethnicity: Itelmens
- Extinct: 1900s
- Language family: Chukotko-Kamchatkan: Kamchatkan; Southern Kamchadal

Language codes
- ISO 639-3: None (mis)
- Glottolog: sout3274
- Pre-contact distribution of Southern Itelmen (turquoise) and other Chukotko-Kamchatkan languages

- Southern Itelmen is classified as Extinct by the UNESCO Atlas of the World's Languages in Danger.

Southern Kamchadal, also known as Southern Itelmen, is an extinct Kamchatkan language of Russia, was spoken by the Itelmen people who traditionally lived in Kamchatka along the Pacific coast. It belonged to the Itelmen group of the Chukotko-Kamchatkan family (not all researchers recognize that the Itelmens belong to the Chukotko-Kamchatkan family). It became extinct by the end of the 19th century.

== Distribution ==
The Southern Itelmen language was widespread around the area of Cape Lopatka and along the Sea of Okhotsk to the north as far as the Khairuzovaya river^{[ru]}, before Russian contact.
