= The Languages of the Peoples of the USSR =

1967 text

- Editor: Viktor Vinogradov
- Original title: Языки народов СССР
- Language: Russian
- Publication date: 1967
- Publication place: Russia

The Languages of the Peoples of the USSR (Russian: Языки народов СССР) is a scholarly work in five volumes published in Moscow in 1967 by Nauka to celebrate the 50th anniversary of the October Revolution. The main editor was Viktor Vinogradov.

The work describes the languages of the Soviet Union in individual chapters. The volumes comprise:

1. Indo-European languages (Индоевропейские языки)
2. Turkic languages (Тюркские языки)
3. Finno-Ugric and Samoyedic languages (Финно-угорские и самодийские языки)
4. Ibero-Caucasian languages (Иберийско-кавказские языки)
5. Mongolic, Tungus-Manchu and Paleosiberian languages (Монгольские, тунгусо-маньчжурские и палеоазиатские языки)
