= Itelmen language =

Chukotko-Kamchatkan language of Kamchatka Krai, Russia

Itelmen
- Western Kamchadal, Western Itelmen
- итэнмэн Itənmən
- Native to: Russia
- Region: Kamchatka Peninsula
- Ethnicity: 2,596 Itelmens (2021)
- Native speakers: 808 (2020 census)
- Revival: early 21st century
- Language family: Chukotko-Kamchatkan: Kamchatkan; Itelmen
- Writing system: Cyrillic script

Language codes
- ISO 639-3: itl
- Glottolog: itel1242
- ELP: Itelmen
- Pre-contact distribution of Western Itelmen and other Chukotko-Kamchatkan languages

- Itelmen is classified as Severely Endangered by the UNESCO Atlas of the World's Languages in Danger.

Itelmen (Itelmen: Itənmən) or Western Itelmen, formerly known as Western Kamchadal, is a language of the Chukotko-Kamchatkan family spoken on the western coast of the Kamchatka Peninsula. Fewer than a hundred native speakers, mostly elderly, in a few settlements in the southwest of Koryak Autonomous Okrug, remained in 1993. The 2021 Census counted 2,596 ethnic Itelmens, virtually all of whom are now monolingual in Russian. However, there are attempts to revive the language, and it is being taught in a number of schools in the region.

(Western) Itelmen is the only surviving Kamchatkan language. It has two dialects, the Southern dialect of Khayryuzovo and the Northern dialect of Sedanka.

== Classification ==
There are two points of view about where Itelmen belongs genetically. According to the first theory, Itelmen and Chukotkan descend from a common proto-language; the sharp differences of Itelmen, noticed at all levels, are explained by the intense influence of other languages. It is suggested that Itelmen absorbed a different non-Chukotko-Kamchatkan language. According to the second theory, Itelmen is not related to other Chukotko-Kamchatkan languages; common elements are due to contact.

Initial comparisons of the basic Itelmen lexicon to Chukotkan show that only a third of the word stock is cognate. This result is preliminary due to the incompleteness of Chukotko-Kamchatkan comparative phonetics. Arends et al. (1995) state that Itelmen is a mixed language, with Chukotkan morphology and a lexicon from a separate language, possibly related to Nivkh or Wakashan. Itelmen would thus be a creole of a Chukotko-Kamchatkan language and Nivkh/Wakashan just as Kamchadal became a creole of Itelmen and Russian. However, Fortescue (2005) partially reconstructed the Chukotko-Kamchatkan proto-language. See Kamchatkan languages.

== History ==
Originally the Kamchatkan languages were spoken throughout Kamchatka and possibly also in the northern Kuril Islands. Vladimir Atlasov, who annexed Kamchatka and established military bases in the region, estimated in 1697 that there were about 20,000 ethnic Itelmens. The explorer Stepan Krasheninnikov, who gave the first detailed description of the Itelmen language and culture, identified the three main dialects, but explained that all Itelmens could understand each other.

From the time of Atlasov, Russian fur traders began to settle in the region. There were frequent clashes between Cossacks and Itelmens, who rebelled against Russian domination. Many Itelmen were forcibly converted to Christianity, and by the early nineteenth century all Itelmen were forced to adopt Russian names. Intermarriage with Russian settlers led to the development of a creole known as Kamchadal, traces of which remain in the Russian dialect now spoken in Kamchatka.

During the Soviet era the process of assimilation intensified, as Itelmen communities were moved by force and children were sent to boarding schools where they were required to speak Russian. By the end of the 1930s Russian was the medium of instruction in all schools, and children grew up speaking Russian as their main language.

However it was also during this period that Itelmen was written down for the first time. In 1930, a Latin-based alphabet was designed for all the native languages of northern Siberia, and in 1932, a 27-letter Itelmen alphabet was created. A few textbooks were written in this alphabet during the 1930s, but it was quickly abandoned. More recently, a Cyrillic-based alphabet, designed in 1986 and consisting of 32 letters, has been used.

== Present situation ==
Itelmen is now a highly endangered language, and most speakers are aged over sixty and live in scattered communities. However, there is a movement to revive the language, and educational materials are being developed. One linguist working on this revival is Jonathan Bobaljik.

There is a single newspaper that publishes in Itelmen (as well as in Even), Абориген Камчатки (Kamchatkan Aborigine).

Modern Itelmen has been heavily influenced by Russian lexically, phonologically and grammatically (see below).

== Phonology ==
Itelmen has a larger phonological inventory than other Chukotko-Kamchatkan languages, and permits complex consonant clusters in some environments. Itelmen also has a different system of vowel harmony than its relatives Chukchi and Koryak.

Volodin (1997) gives the following consonant inventory, shown here with both the Cyrillic and IPA forms. Itelmen is unusual in having a voicing (VOT) distinction in fricatives but not in plosives.

		Bilabial	Alveolar	Palatal	Velar	Uvular
Plosive/ Affricate	plain	p ⟨п⟩	t ⟨т⟩	t͡ʃ ⟨ч⟩	k ⟨к⟩	q ⟨ӄ⟩
Plosive/ Affricate	ejective	pʼ ⟨пʼ⟩	tʼ ⟨тʼ⟩	t͡ʃʼ ⟨чʼ⟩	kʼ ⟨кʼ⟩	qʼ ⟨ӄʼ⟩
Fricative/ Approximant	voiceless	ɸ ⟨ф⟩	s ⟨с⟩		x ⟨х⟩	χ ⟨ӽ⟩
Fricative/ Approximant	voiced	β ⟨в⟩	z ⟨з⟩	j ⟨й⟩		
Nasal		m ⟨м⟩	n ⟨н⟩	ɲ ⟨њ⟩	ŋ ⟨ӈ⟩	
Lateral	fricative		ɬ ⟨ԓ⟩			
Lateral	approximant		l ⟨л⟩	ʎ ⟨љ⟩		
Trill			r ⟨р⟩			

In addition to the consonants shown above, some sources also include the glottal stop /ʔ/, as well as glottalised nasal and lateral phonemes, including /mˀ/, /nˀ/, and /lˀ/. 's' and 'z' may be apical post-alveolar fricatives rather than alveolar fricatives. There may also be distinct labialised consonant phonemes.

There are five vowel phonemes: /a/, /e/, /i/, /o/, and /u/. Schwa ([ə]) also appears but its phonemic status is unclear.

== Orthography ==
Itelmen is not standardized and does not have a separate literary variety. A retelling of Itelmen mythology was written in Russian by Krasheninnikov. Folk language (only recordings from the 20th century survive, in the western language) does not show special characteristics compared to the conversational language.

Writing based on Latin graphemes was introduced in 1932 (an alphabet book and arithmetic textbook were published). Teaching from the alphabet book of 1932 (authored by ethnographer Elizabeth Porfirevna Orlova and co-produced by a group of Itelmen students) lasted several years, but after alphabets for "Northern" languages were transformed into Cyrillic at the end of the 1930s, Itelmen writing was abolished. Itelmen became an unwritten language again and remained that way for almost a half-century.

Itelmen alphabet based on Latin letters
А а	B ʙ	C c	D d	E e	F f	G g	H h
I i	Ь ь	J j	K k	L l	Ł ł	M m	N n
Ŋ ŋ	O o	P p	Q q	R r	S s	T t	U u
W w	X x	Z z

The modern Itelmen alphabet was created in 1984 on a Cyrillic basis and in 1988 was confirmed by the Russian Ministry of Education. A second Itelmen alphabet book was created in 1988. An Itelmen-Russian/Russian-Itelmen dictionary and second-grade textbook were also published. In 1993 the Itelmen alphabet book was republished. Itelmen has been taught as a subject in elementary grades, but teachers do not speak the language like the students. In 2002 a translation of the Gospel of Luke was published in Itelmen. All of these works are published in the Southern dialect.

Modern Itelmen alphabet
А а	Ӑ ӑ	Б б	В в	Г г	Д д	Е е	Ё ё
Ж ж	З з	И и	Й й	К к	Кʼ кʼ	Ӄ ӄ	Ӄʼ ӄʼ
Л л	Љ љ	Ԓ ԓ	М м	Н н	Њ њ	Ӈ ӈ	О о
О̆ о̆	П п	Пʼ пʼ	Р р	С с	Т т	Тʼ тʼ	У у
Ў ў	Ф ф	Х х	Ӽ ӽ	Ц ц	Ч ч	Чʼ чʼ	Ш ш
Щ щ	Ъ ъ	Ы ы	Ь ь	Ә ә	Э э	Ю ю	Я я

A labialisation sign (˚) and a glottal stop sign (ʼ) are also used in instructional works. In the sequence of instructionally published signs Ă ă, Ŏ ŏ, Ў ў are not considered separate letters. Also, most publications use original "Ԯ ԯ" (or "Ӆ ӆ") and "Ҳ ҳ" rather than the designs "Ԓ ԓ" and "Ӽ ӽ" invented by Просвещение publishing house.

The newspaper Native of Kamchatka, which regularly publishes works in Itelmen, does not use the letters Ă ă, Ŏ ŏ, Ў ў but uses the deepening sign (˚).

== Morphology ==
=== External influence ===
There may be different answers given to the question of which elements of Itelmen are original and which have been brought about by contact with other languages. To take the second hypothesis, Itelmen was at the very beginning an agglutinative language, with word structure (m) + R + (m) (where R is a root and (m) one of several word-changing morphemes), it was nominal, compounds were prohibited; it preserves all of these elements into the present. A difference in reported material origin with Chukotko-Koryak languages in declensional and conjugational paradigms is the result of convergent development under conditions of a Chukotko-Kamchatkan sprachbund. Incorporation goes against word structure (not more than one root morpheme), thus Itelmen did not take it on. Reduplication of a root, inherent to all the languages of the Chukotko-Kamchatkan group, was able to develop in Itelmen apart from the influence of contact.

Russian borrowings in Itelmen started to appear as early as the 17th century. Among the Russian words that were borrowed, in some cases replacing Itelmen words, adjectives and adverbs predominate and even preserve Russian morphology: vostr-oy sharp-NOM.MASC.SG, krasn-oy red-NOM.MASC.SG, sinny-oy blue-NOM.MASC.SG, svez-oy fresh-NOM.MASC.SG, etc. Borrowed verbs adapt in accordance with the demands of Itelmen morphology: Itel. stara'lkas (Rus. starat'sya) means 'to try', Itel. otkaza'lkas (Rus. otkazyvat'sya) 'to deny,' It. napraves means 'to cook food'. To speak of Russian borrowings in Itelmen today is hardly possible, because all Itelmens speak Russian much better than their ethnic language.

== Syntax ==
The Itelmen language is an agglutinative language, it has affixes for nouns and verbs, and most of its affixes are suffixes.

Its basic word order is subject–object–verb. Numerals and demonstratives are placed before the noun they modify, although adjectives can be placed before or after the noun they modify.

== Bibliography ==
- Volodin, Aleksandr P. (1976). Itelʹmenskij jazyk. Leningrad: Izd. Nauka.
- Volodin, Aleksandr P. & Klavdija N. Chalojmova. (1989). Slovarʹ itelʹmensko—russkij i russko—itelʹmenskij. Leningrad: Prosveščenie. ISBN 5-09-000106-5.
