= Kerek language =

Extinct Chukotko-Kamchatkan language of northeast Russia

Kerek
- аӈӄалҕакку angqalghakku
- Native to: Russia
- Region: Chukotka Autonomous Okrug
- Ethnicity: Kereks
- Extinct: 2005, with the death of Ekaterina Khatkana; 4 (2020)
- Language family: Chukotko-Kamchatkan: Chukotkan; Kerek
- Dialects: Maino-Pilgin; Khatyr

Language codes
- ISO 639-3: krk
- Glottolog: kere1280
- ELP: Kerek
- Pre-contact distribution of Kerek (dark orange) and other Chukotko-Kamchatkan languages

- Kerek is classified as Extinct by the UNESCO Atlas of the World's Languages in Danger.

Kerek (Russian: Керекский язык, romanized: Kereksky yazyk) is an extinct indigenous language in Russia of the Chukotkan branch of the Chukotko-Kamchatkan languages. Before its extinction, it was spoken by the Kereks of the Russian Far East. It went extinct in 2005 with the death of Ekaterina Khatkana.

== Classification ==
On historical linguistic grounds it is most closely related to Koryak (both languages have a merger of the Proto-Chukotko-Kamchatkan phonemes /*ð/ and /*r/ with /*j/). The next closest relative is Chukchi (/*ð/ and /*r/ are merged, but not /*j/).

== Dialects ==
There were two dialects, the Maino-Pilgin and Khatyr dialects.

== Usage ==
In 1997 there were still two speakers remaining, but in 2005 the language went extinct, with the death of Ekaterina Khatkana. According to the 2010 census, there were 10 people claiming Kerek as their native language, believed to only consist of partial speakers and non-speakers who claim the language as part of their ethnic heritage. In 2020, that number decreased to 4. Over the 20th century, many members of the Kerek ethnic group shifted to Chukchi, the language of the majority ethnic group in the area, but now most Chukchis and Kereks speak Russian.

== Phonology ==
=== Vowels ===
Vowels of Kerek
	Front	Central	Back
Close	i		u
Mid		ə	o
Open		a	

Vowels may be long.

=== Consonants ===
Consonants of Kerek
	Bilabial	Dental	Palatal	Velar	Uvular	Pharyngeal	Glottal
Plosive	p	t		k	q		ʔ
Affricate			tʃ				
Fricative		(s)				ʕ	
Nasal	m	n		ŋ			
Sonorant	w	l	j				

Consonants may also be long, /l/ is palatalized [lʲ] intervocalically, and /tʃ/ is pronounced as [s] by some.

== Grammar ==
Kerek is an agglutinative language, meaning that the morphemes build on each other to have different meanings.
