= Eastern Itelmen language =

Extinct Kamchatkan language of Russia

Eastern Kamchadal
- (North-)Eastern Itelmen
- Native to: Russia
- Region: Kamchatka Peninsula
- Ethnicity: Itelmens
- Extinct: 1930s
- Language family: Chukotko-Kamchatkan: Kamchatkan; Eastern Kamchadal

Language codes
- ISO 639-3: None (mis)
- Glottolog: east2812
- Pre-contact distribution of Eastern Itelmen (green) and other Chukotko-Kamchatkan languages

- Eastern Itelmen is classified as Extinct by the UNESCO Atlas of the World's Languages in Danger.

Eastern Kamchadal, also known as Eastern Itelmen (or Northern, Northeastern of the same) is an extinct Kamchatkan language of Russia, which was spoken by the Itelmen people who traditionally lived in Kamchatka along the Pacific coast. It belonged to the Itelmen group of the Chukotko-Kamchatkan family (not all researchers recognize that the Itelmen languages belong to the Chukotko-Kamchatkan family). It became extinct by the first third of the 19th century.

== Distribution ==
The Eastern Itelmen language was widespread mainly in the areas of the Cossack and Russian settlers' forts, along the Kamchatka River, before and during early contact.

== Dialects ==
Northern dialect (according to Krasheninnikov and Pallas, it falls into the category of "Koryak dialects" due to the cultural proximity and sedentary lifestyle of the Nymylans and Eastern Kamchadals).

Ukinsky dialect (Uk) = North-North-Eastern (NNE) (characterized by Koryak, Palan^{[ru]} and Karagin^{[ru]} borrowings).
