= Kamchatkan languages =

Branch of Chukotko-Kamchatkan containing Itelmen

Kamchatkan
- Itelmen
- Geographic distribution: Russian Far East
- Linguistic classification: Chukotko-Kamchatkan: Kamchatkan
- Subdivisions: Eastern Kamchadal †; Western Kamchadal; Southern Kamchadal †

Language codes
- Glottolog: kamc1243 (Kamchatkan)
- Pre-contact distribution of Kamchatkan languages (green-blue) and other Chukotko-Kamchatkan languages

Kamchatkan (Kamchatic) is a former dialect cluster spoken on the Kamchatka Peninsula. It now consists of a single language, Western Itelmen (also called Western Kamchadal). It had 100 or fewer speakers in 1991, mostly of the older generation. The Russian census of 2010 still reported 80 speakers.

There are incomplete records attesting of at least two other divergent varieties, Eastern (also: Northern) Kamchadal and Southern Kamchadal, both extinct in the late 18th century.

Kamchadal languages, though traditionally considered dialects, were apparently distinct enough to be classified as separate languages. The three varieties were spoken in western, eastern, and southern Kamchatka. The degree of difference can be illustrated with the pronoun 'we', which is Western muza, muza'n, Southern muš, burin, Eastern buze.

Kamchatkan is not closely related to the Chukotkan languages. Although distant enough for doubts about its relationship to have been raised (as in Volodin 1976), cognate morphology clearly demonstrates that it forms a family with Chukotkan, though it also has some striking contrasts, especially in the area of phonology. The Chukotko-Kamchatkan proto-language has been partially reconstructed.

Michael Fortescue believes that Kamchatkan may have a substratum of a language formerly spoken by a remnant Beringian population. For instance, Kamchatkan has ejectives, which are common among languages of the Pacific Northwest, but rare in languages of Northeast Asia.
