= Chukotko-Kamchatkan languages =

Language family of the Russian Far East

Chukotko-Kamchatkan
- Chukchi–Kamchatkan, Luorawetlan
- Geographic distribution: Russian Far East
- Linguistic classification: One of the world's primary language families
- Proto-language: Proto-Chukotko-Kamchatkan
- Subdivisions: Chukotkan; Kamchatkan

Language codes
- Glottolog: chuk1271
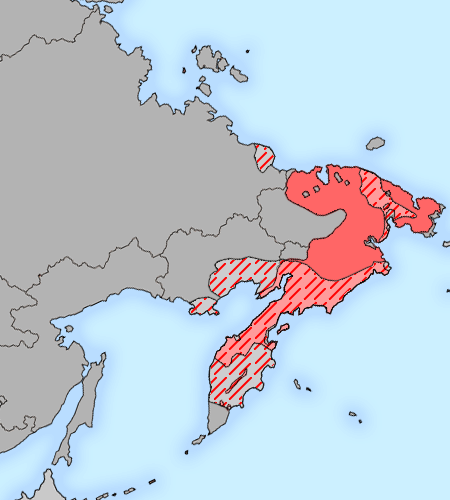
- The distribution of Chukotko-Kamchatkan languages (red) in the 17th century (hatching, approximate) and at the end of the 20th century (solid).

The Chukotko-Kamchatkan or Chukchi–Kamchatkan languages are a language family of extreme northeastern Siberia. Its speakers traditionally were indigenous hunter-gatherers and reindeer-herders. Chukotko-Kamchatkan is endangered. The Kamchatkan branch is moribund, represented only by Western Itelmen, with less than a hundred speakers left. The Chukotkan branch had close to 7,000 speakers left (as of 2010, the majority being speakers of Chukchi), with a reported total ethnic population of 25,000.

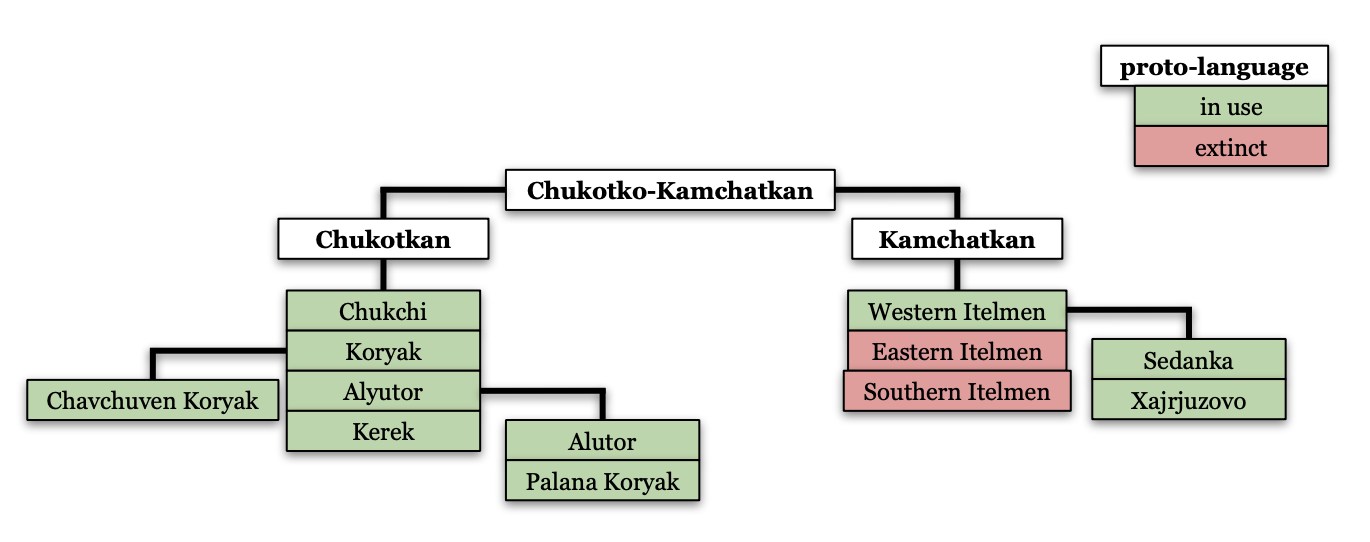
The language family tree of the Chukotko-Kamchatkan languages.

While the family is sometimes grouped typologically and geographically as Paleosiberian, no external genetic relationship has been widely accepted as proven. The most popular such proposals have been for links with Eskimo–Aleut, either alone or in the context of a wider grouping.

== Alternative names ==
Less commonly encountered names for the family are Chukchian, Chukotian, Chukotan, Kamchukchee and Kamchukotic. Of these, Chukchian, Chukotian and Chukotan are ambiguous, since the three terms are sometimes used to refer specifically to the family's northern branch; the last two names are portmanteau words referring to both branches.

In addition, Luorawetlan (also spelled Luoravetlan) has been in wide use since 1775 as a name for the family, although it is properly the self-designation of one of its constituent languages, Chukchi.

Map of the Chukotko-Kamchatkan languages. Languages with labels accompanied by a dagger (†) are extinct.

== Languages ==
The Chukotko-Kamchatkan family consists of two distantly related dialect clusters, Chukotkan and Kamchatkan. Chukotkan is considered anywhere from three to five languages, whereas there is only one surviving Kamchatkan language, Itelmen.

The relationship of the Chukotkan languages to Itelmen is at best distant, and has been met with only partial acceptance by scholars.

All the Chukotko-Kamchatkan languages are under pressure from Russian. Almost all speakers are bilingual in Russian, and few members of the ethnic groups associated with the languages born after 1970 speak any language but Russian.

The accepted classification is this:

- Chukotko-Kamchatkan
  - Kamchatkan
    - Southern Itelmen †
    - Eastern Itelmen †
    - Itelmen (Western Kamchadal)
  - Chukotkan
    - Chukchi
    - Koryak
    - Alyutor
    - Kerek †

== Relation to other language families ==
The Chukotko-Kamchatkan languages have no generally accepted relation to any other language family. There are several theories about possible relationships to existing or hypothetical language families.

=== Paleosiberian ===
The Chukotko-Kamchatkan languages are sometimes classified among the Paleosiberian languages, a catch-all term for language groups with no identified relationship to one another that are believed to represent remnants of the language map of Siberia prior to the advances of Turkic and Tungusic.

=== Eurasiatic ===
Joseph Greenberg identifies Chukotko-Kamchatkan (which he names Chukotian) as a member of Eurasiatic, a proposed macrofamily that includes Indo-European, Altaic, and Eskimo–Aleut, among others. Greenberg also assigns Nivkh and Yukaghir, sometimes classed as "Paleosiberian" languages, to the Eurasiatic family.

While the Eurasiatic hypothesis has been well received by Nostraticists and some Indo-Europeanists, it remains very controversial. Part of the reason is that the Eurasiatic hypothesis rests on mass comparison of lexemes, grammatical formatives, and vowel systems (see Greenberg 2000–2002), rather than on the prevailing view that regular sound correspondences that are linked to a wide array of lexemes and grammatical formatives are the only valid means to establish genetic relationship (see for instance Baldi 2002:2–19).

Murray Gell-Mann, Ilia Peiros, and Georgiy Starostin group Chukotko-Kamchatkan languages and Nivkh with Almosan instead of Eurasiatic.

=== Uralo-Siberian ===
In 1998, Michael Fortescue, a specialist in Eskimo–Aleut as well as in Chukotko-Kamchatkan, argued for a link between Uralic, Yukaghir, Chukotko-Kamchatkan, and Eskimo–Aleut calling this proposed grouping Uralo-Siberian.

=== Chukotko-Kamchatkan–Amuric ===
In 2011, Fortescue instead suggested that Nivkh (Gilyak, Amuric), another Paleo-Siberian language, is related to Chukotko-Kamchatkan on the basis of morphological, typological, and lexical evidence as the closest relative of Chukotko-Kamchatkan and came to prefer an interpretation of the similarities to Uralo-Siberian through language contact. Together, Chukotko-Kamchatkan and Nivkh could form a larger Chukotko-Kamchatkan-Amuric language family, and their common ancestor might have been spoken 4000 years ago.

=== Possible clade with Indo-European ===
In a 2015 paper, Gerhard Jäger of the University of Tübingen reported "intriguing" and "controversial" findings regarding Chukotko-Kamchatkan and Indo-European and other language families. Using a variant of mass lexical comparison, augmented by computational linguistic techniques, such as large-scale statistical analysis, Jäger investigated "deep genetic relations" between many different language families. To increase the chances that genuine genetic relationships were detected, he eliminated from consideration "rogue taxa," languages and families that had ambiguous positions because of random similarities or recent language contact.

Jäger found evidence that Chukotko-Kamchatkan and the Indo-European languages had statistically-significant similarities with each other, suggesting that they may have once formed part of a clade. On the whole, similarities between the two families were greater than either shared with any other language family. That was the case even when Jäger factored in similarities in phonology that were likely random coincidences (such as a "surprisingly high number" of resemblances in vocabulary between Chukotko-Kamchatkan and the Goidelic branch of the Celtic languages).

According to Jäger, when these "rogue taxa" were removed, the confidence value of a notional "Indo-European/Chukotko-Kamchatkan clade" fell only slightly, from 0.969 to a still statistically-significant 0.964.

== See also ==
- Kamchadal
- Proto-Chukotko-Kamchatkan
