= Chukotkan languages =

Dialect cluster of Chukotko-Kamchatkan languages of northeast Russia

Chukotkan
- Ləɣˀoravetlˀan
- Geographic distribution: Russian Far East
- Linguistic classification: Chukotko-Kamchatkan: Chukotkan
- Subdivisions: Chukchi; Koryak; Alyutor; Kerek †

Language codes
- Glottolog: chuk1272
- Pre-contact distribution of Chukotkan languages (red-orange) and other Chukotko-Kamchatkan languages

Chukotkan (Chukotian, Chukotic) is a dialect cluster that forms one branch of the Chukotko-Kamchatkan language family. It is spoken in two autonomous regions at the extreme northeast of Russia, bounded on the east by the Pacific and on the north by the Arctic.

The term Luorawetlan (Luoravetlan), used for Chukchi in the 1930s, is actually based on the ethnonym of both the Chukchi and Koryak.

== Varieties ==
- Chukchi, spoken mostly within Chukotka Autonomous Okrug.
- Koryak, also called Nymylan, spoken in Koryak Okrug of Kamchatka Krai. The main dialect is known as Chavchuven Koryak.
- Alyutor (Alutor, Aliutor), also spoken in Koryakia.
- Kerek, spoken along the southern coast of Chukotka. In 1997 two elderly speakers remained, but now the language is extinct, with the ethnic group assimilated into the Chukchi (Fortescue 2005: 1).

Traditionally, Chukotkan was considered to be two languages, Chukchi and Koryak, due to a sharp ethnic division between the Chukchi and Koryak people. However, the Kerek and Alyutor dialects, spoken by ethnic Chukchi and Koryak, are as different from those varieties as they are from each other. Thus Chukotkan is currently generally classified as four languages, but it could as easily be considered one language with significant dialectal variation.
