= Koryak language =

Chukotko-Kamchatkan language of Kamchatka, Russia

Koryak
- чавʼчывэн čawčyven; чавʼчываелыел čawčyvajelyjel
- Koryak language in Koryak with transliteration
- Native to: Russia
- Region: Koryak Okrug
- Ethnicity: 7,485 Koryaks
- Native speakers: 1,665, 21% of ethnic population (2010 census)
- Language family: Chukotko-Kamchatkan: Chukotkan; Koryak
- Dialects: Chavchuven Koryak; Apuka Koryak; Kamen Koryak; Paren Koryak; Itkan Koryak

Language codes
- ISO 639-3: kpy
- Glottolog: kory1246
- ELP: Koryak
- Pre-contact distribution of Koryak (purple) and other Chukotko-Kamchatkan languages

- Koryak is classified as Definitely Endangered by the UNESCO Atlas of the World's Languages in Danger.

Koryak (/ˈkɔːriæk/ KOR-ee-ak), also known as Nymylan, Chavchuven and Koræiki, is a Chukotko-Kamchatkan language spoken by 1,665 people as of 2010 in the easternmost extremity of Siberia, mainly in Koryak Okrug. It is mostly spoken by Koryaks. Its close relative, the Chukchi language, is spoken by about three times that number. The language together with Chukchi, Alyutor and Itelmen forms the Chukotko-Kamchatkan language family. Its native name in Koryak is нымылан nymylan, but variants of the Russian name "Koryak" are most commonly used in English and other languages. The Chukchis and Koryaks form a cultural unit with an economy based on reindeer herding and both have autonomy within Russia.

== Phonology ==
Koryak vowels
	Front	Central	Back
Close	i		u
Mid	ɛ	ə	o
Open		a	

Koryak consonants
	Bilabial	Labiodental	Alveolar	Palatal	Velar	Uvular	Pharyngeal
Plosive	p		t	c	k	q	
Fricative	β	v			ɣ		ʕ
Affricate				t͡ʃ			
Nasal	m		n	ɲ	ŋ		
Liquid			l	ʎ			
Approximant				j			

[w] may be an allophone of /β/.

== Orthography ==
А а	Б б	В в	Вʼ вʼ	Г г	Гʼ гʼ	Д д	Е е
Ё ё	Ж ж	З з	И и	Й й	К к	Ӄ ӄ	Л л
М м	Н н	Ӈ ӈ	О о	П п	Р р	С с	Т т
У у	Ф ф	Х х	Ц ц	Ч ч	Ш ш	Щ щ	Ъ ъ
Ы ы	Ь ь	Э э	Ю ю	Я я
