= Indigenous peoples of Siberia =

Коренные народы Сибири

Total population
- 1.6–1.8 million 5% of the total Siberian population

Regions with significant populations
- Siberia

Languages
- Russian (lingua franca); Indigenous Siberian language families: Ainu · Chukotko-Kamchatkan · Eskaleut · Mongolic · Nivkh · Tungusic · Turkic · Uralic · Yeniseian (Ket) · Yukaghir

Religion
- Russian Orthodox Christianity · Sunni Islam · Tibetan Buddhism · Siberian shamanism (Tengrism · Mongolian · Turkic · Yupik)

Siberia is a vast region spanning the northern part of the Asian continent and forming the Asiatic portion of Russia. As a result of the Russian conquest of Siberia (16th to 19th centuries) and of the subsequent population movements during the Soviet era (1917–1991), the modern-day demographics of Siberia is dominated by ethnic Russians (Siberiaks) and other Slavs. However, there remains a slowly increasing number of Indigenous groups, accounting for about 5% of the total Siberian population (about 1.6–1.8 million), some of which are closely genetically related to Indigenous peoples of the Americas.

== History ==
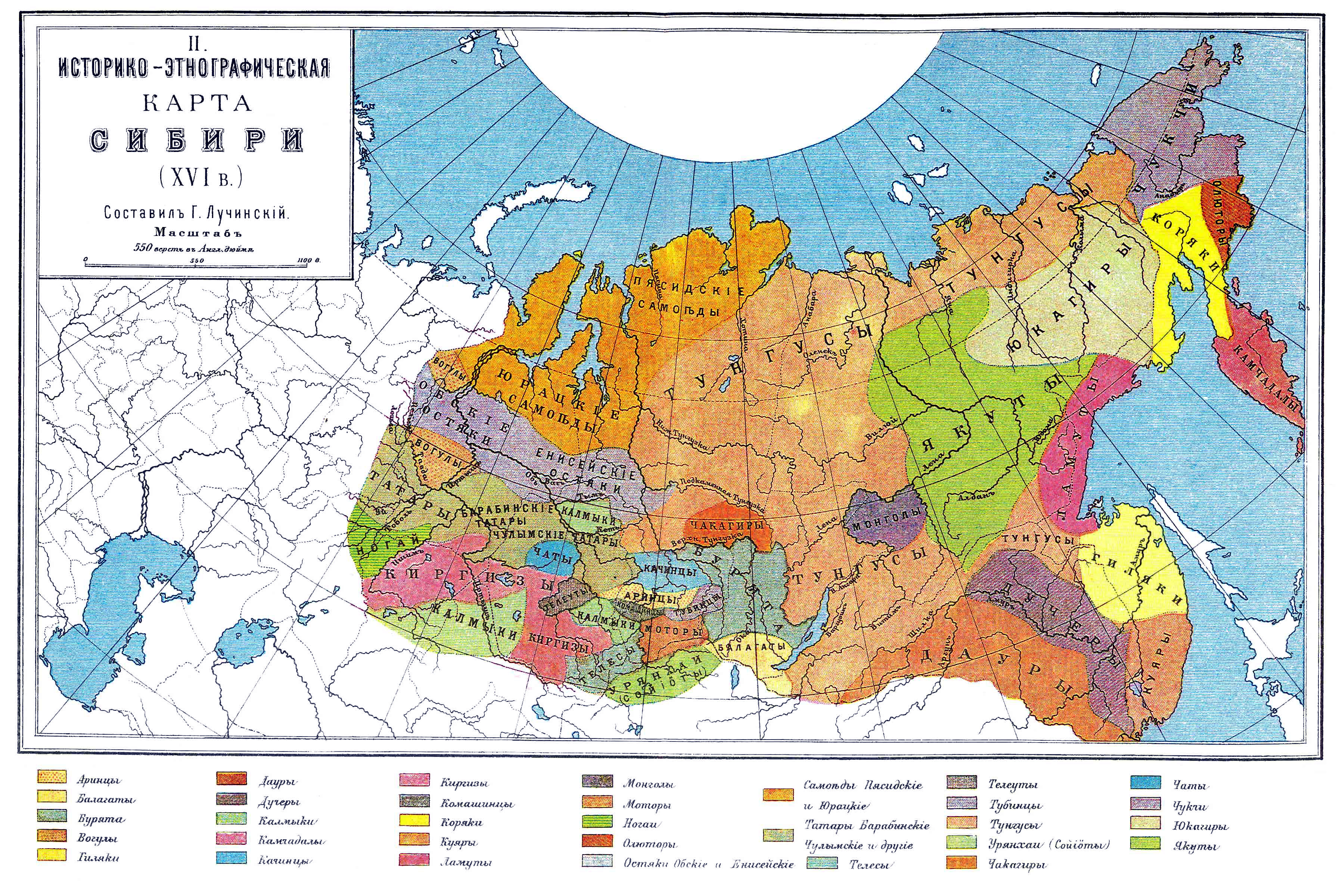
An ethnographic map of 16th-century Siberia, made in the Russian Empire period, between 1890 and 1907

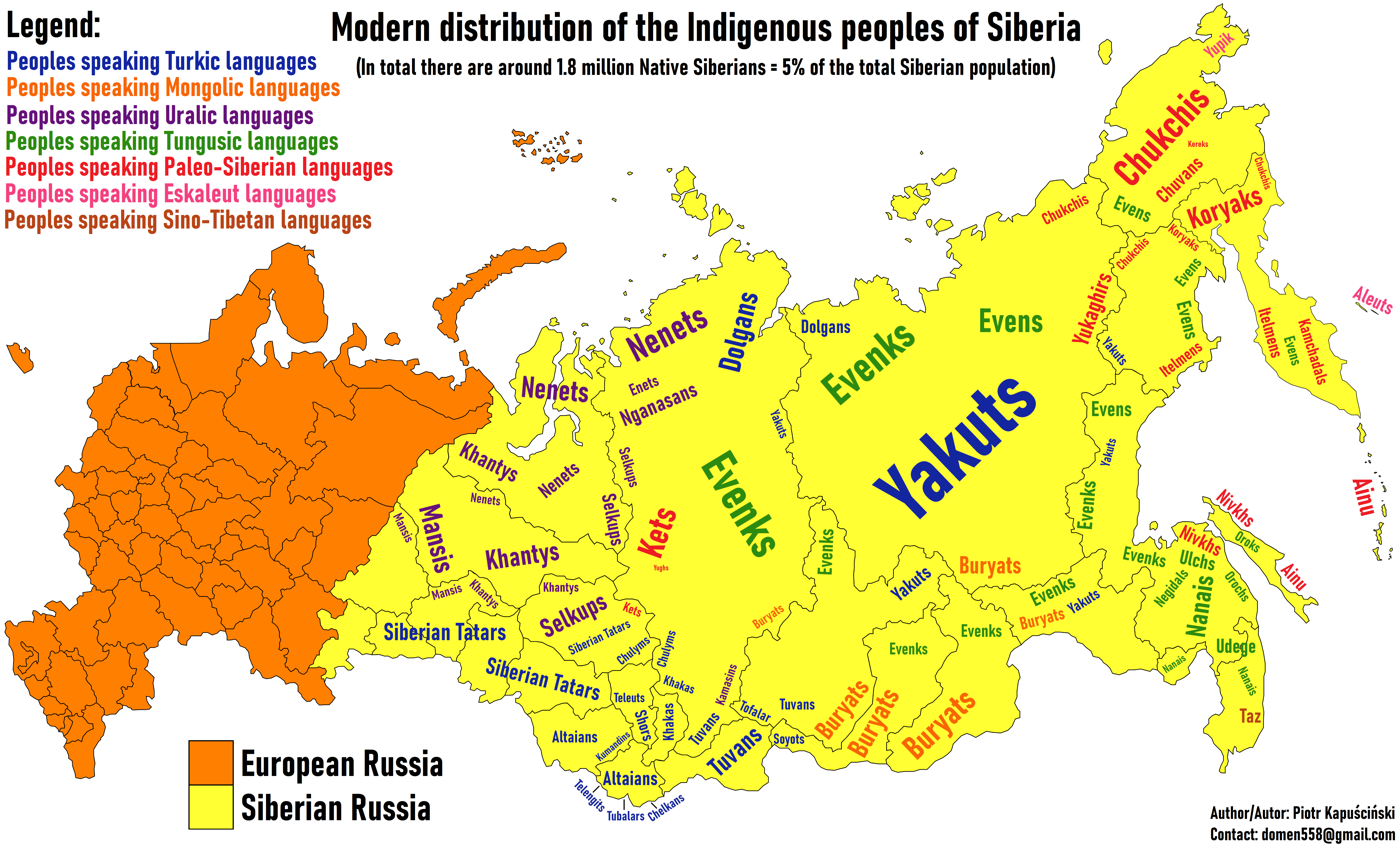
Modern distribution of Native Siberians

In Kamchatka, the Itelmens' uprisings against Russian rule in 1706, 1731, and 1741, were crushed. During the first uprising the Itelmen were armed with only stone weapons, but in later uprisings they used gunpowder weapons. The Russian Cossack mercenaries faced tougher resistance from the Koryaks, who revolted with bows and guns from 1745 to 1756, and were even forced to give up in their attempts to wipe out the Chukchi in 1729, 1730–1731, and 1744–1747. After the Russian defeat in 1729 at Chukchi hands, the Russian commander Major Dmitry Pavlutsky was responsible for the Russian war against the Chukchi and the mass slaughters and enslavement of Chukchi women and children in 1730–1731, but his cruelty only made the Chukchi fight more fiercely.

A war against the Chukchi and Koryaks was ordered by Empress Elizabeth in 1742 to totally expel them from their native lands and erase their culture through war. The command was that the natives be "totally extirpated" with Pavlutskiy leading again in this war from 1744 to 1747 in which he led to the Cossacks "with the help of Almighty God and to the good fortune of Her Imperial Highness", to slaughter the Chukchi men and enslave their women and children as booty. However this phase of the war came to an inconclusive end, when the Chukchi forced them to give up by killing Pavlutskiy and successfully decapitating him.

The Russians launched wars and conducted mass slaughters against the Koryaks in 1744 and 1753–1754. After the Russians attempted to force the natives to convert to Christianity, different native peoples such as the Koryaks, Chukchi, Itelmens, and Yukaghirs all united to drive the Russians out of their land in the 1740s, culminating in the assault on Nizhnekamchatsk fort in 1746 and the utter destruction of the Russian forces. After its annexation by Russia in 1697, around 100,000 of 150,000 Itelmen and Koryaks died due to infectious diseases such as smallpox, mass suicides and the mass slaughters perpetrated by the Cossacks throughout the first decades of Russian rule.

The genocide by the Russian Cossacks devastated the native peoples of Kamchatka and exterminated much of their population. In addition to committing genocide, the Cossacks also devastated the wildlife by slaughtering massive numbers of animals for fur. Ninety percent of the Kamchadals and half of the Voguls were killed from the 18th to 19th centuries. The rapid genocide of the Indigenous population led to entire ethnic groups being entirely wiped out, with around 12 exterminated groups which were named by Nikolai Yadrintsev as of 1882. Much of the slaughter was brought on by the Siberian fur trade.

In the 17th century, Indigenous peoples of the Amur region were attacked and colonized by Russians who came to be known as "red-beards". The Russian Cossacks were named luocha (羅剎) or rakshasa by Amur natives, after demons found in Buddhist mythology. The natives of the Amur region feared the Russian invaders as they ruthlessly colonized the Amur tribes, who were tributaries of the Qing dynasty during the Sino–Russian border conflicts. Qing forces and Korean musketeers who were allied with the Qing defeated the Cossacks in 1658, which kept the Russians out of the inner reaches of the Amur region for decades.

The regionalist oblastniki were, in the 19th century, among the Russians in Siberia who acknowledged that the natives were subjected to violence of almost genocidal proportions by the Russian colonization. They claimed that they would rectify the situation with their proposed regionalist policies. The colonizers used massacres, alcoholism, and disease to bring the natives under their control. Some small nomadic groups essentially disappeared, and much of the evidence of their obliteration has itself been destroyed, with only a few artifacts documenting their presence remaining in Russian museums and collections.

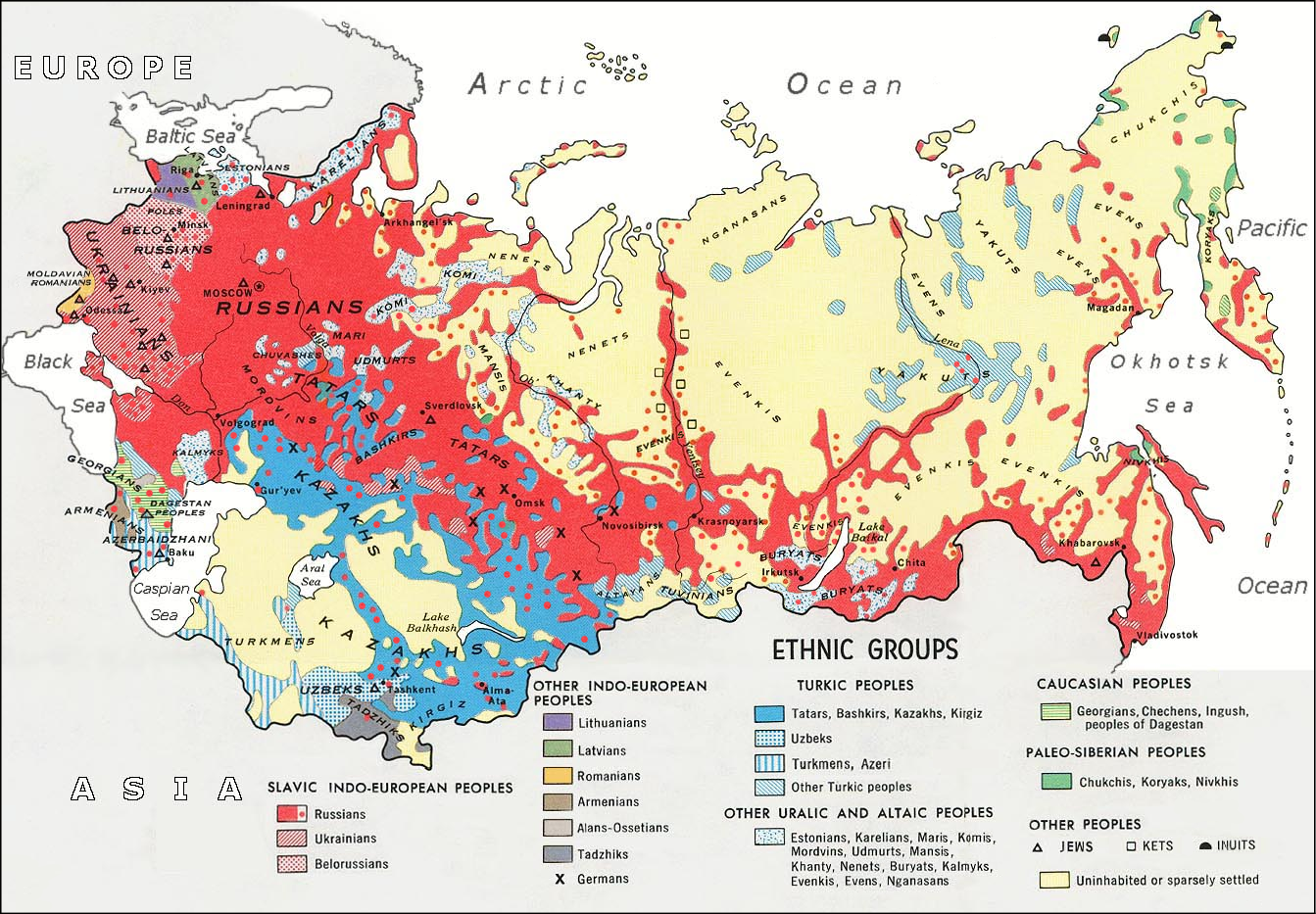
Ethnographic map of the Soviet Union, 1970

The Russian colonization of Siberia and conquest of its Indigenous peoples has been compared to European colonization in the United States and its natives, with similar negative impacts on the natives and the theft of their land at the hands of European imperialists.

From 1918 to 1921, there was a violent revolutionary upheaval in Siberia during the Russian Civil War. Russian Cossacks under Captain Grigori Semionov established themselves as warlords by crushing the Indigenous peoples who resisted them. The Czechoslovak Legion initially took control of Vladivostok and controlled all of the territory along the Trans-Siberian Railway by September 1918. The Legion later declared its neutrality and was evacuated via Vladivostok.

Today, Kamchatka is largely populated by a Russian majority, although decreasing, with a slowly increasing indigenous population. The Slavic Russians outnumber all of the native peoples in Siberia and its cities except in Tuva and Sakha (where the Tuvans and Yakuts serve as the majority ethnic groups respectively), with the Slavic Russians making up the majority in Buryatia and the Altai Republic, outnumbering the Buryat and Altai natives.

== Overview ==
Siberia is a sparsely populated region. Historically it has been home to a variety of different linguistic groups. According to some estimates, by the beginning of the 17th century, Indigenous peoples numbered 160,000. In the 1897 census, their number was 822,000. The 2010 census recorded 1,608,000 Indigenous Siberians and the 2021 census recorded 1,635,000 Indigenous Siberians.

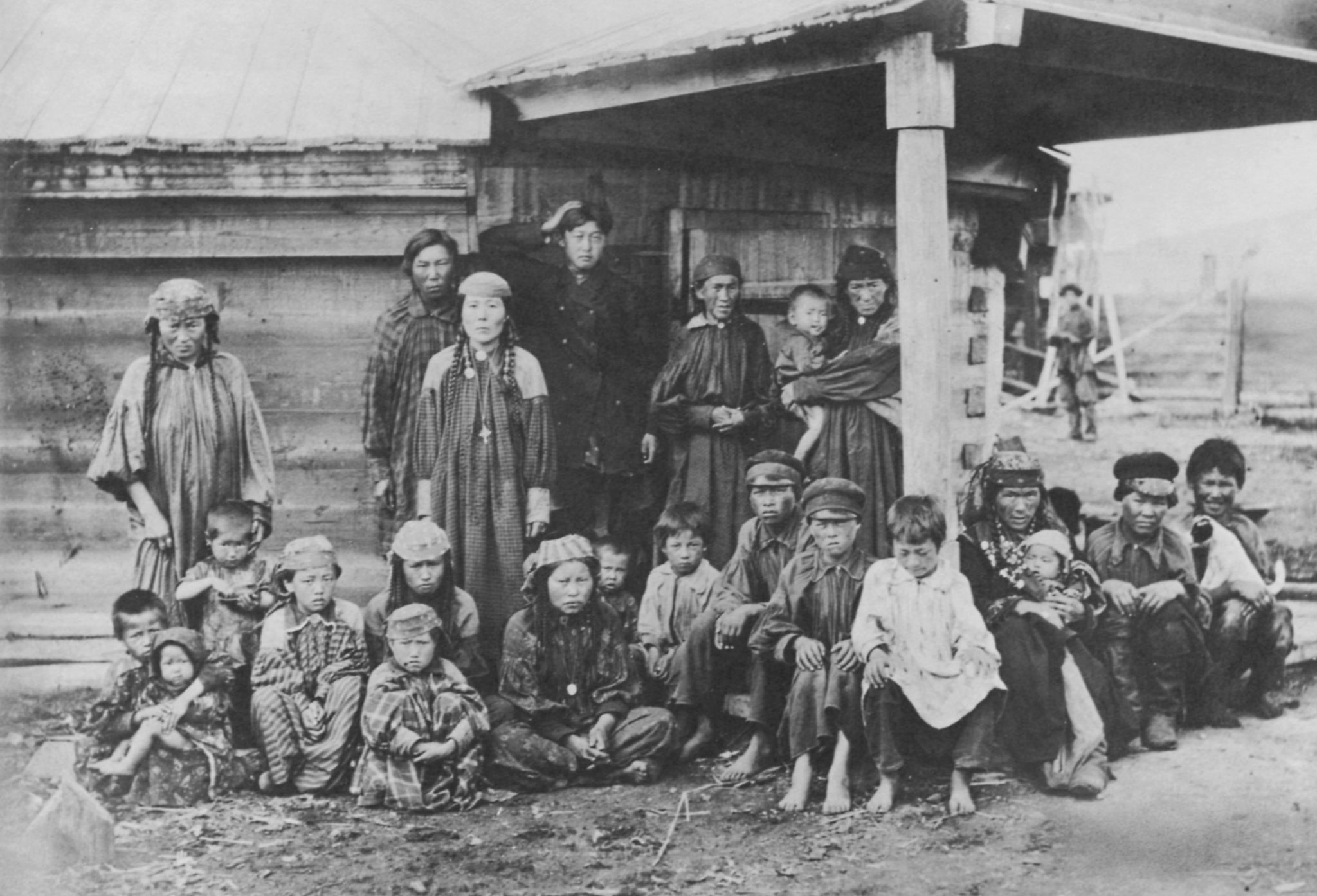
A group of Kachin Khakas

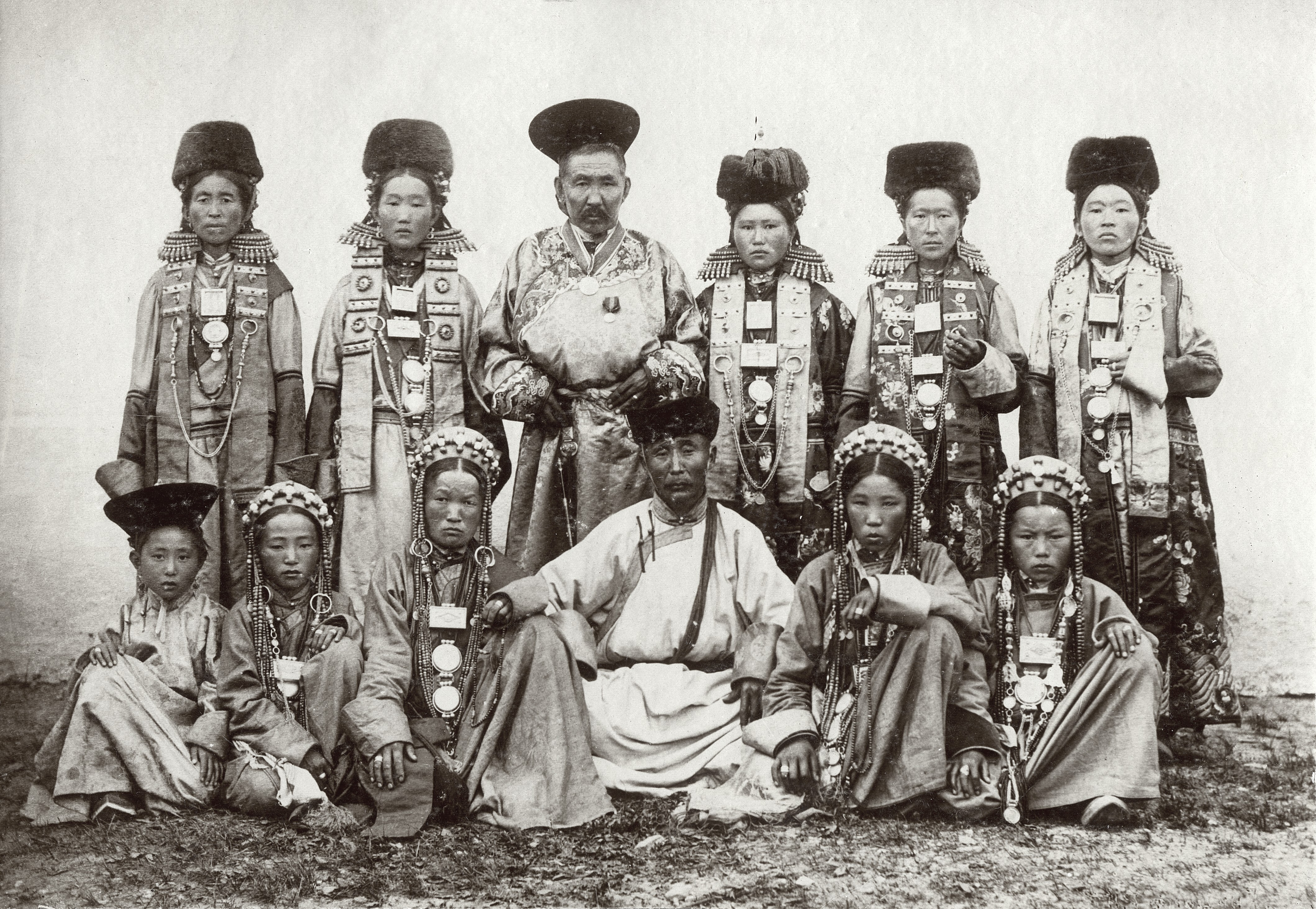
Selenga Buryats

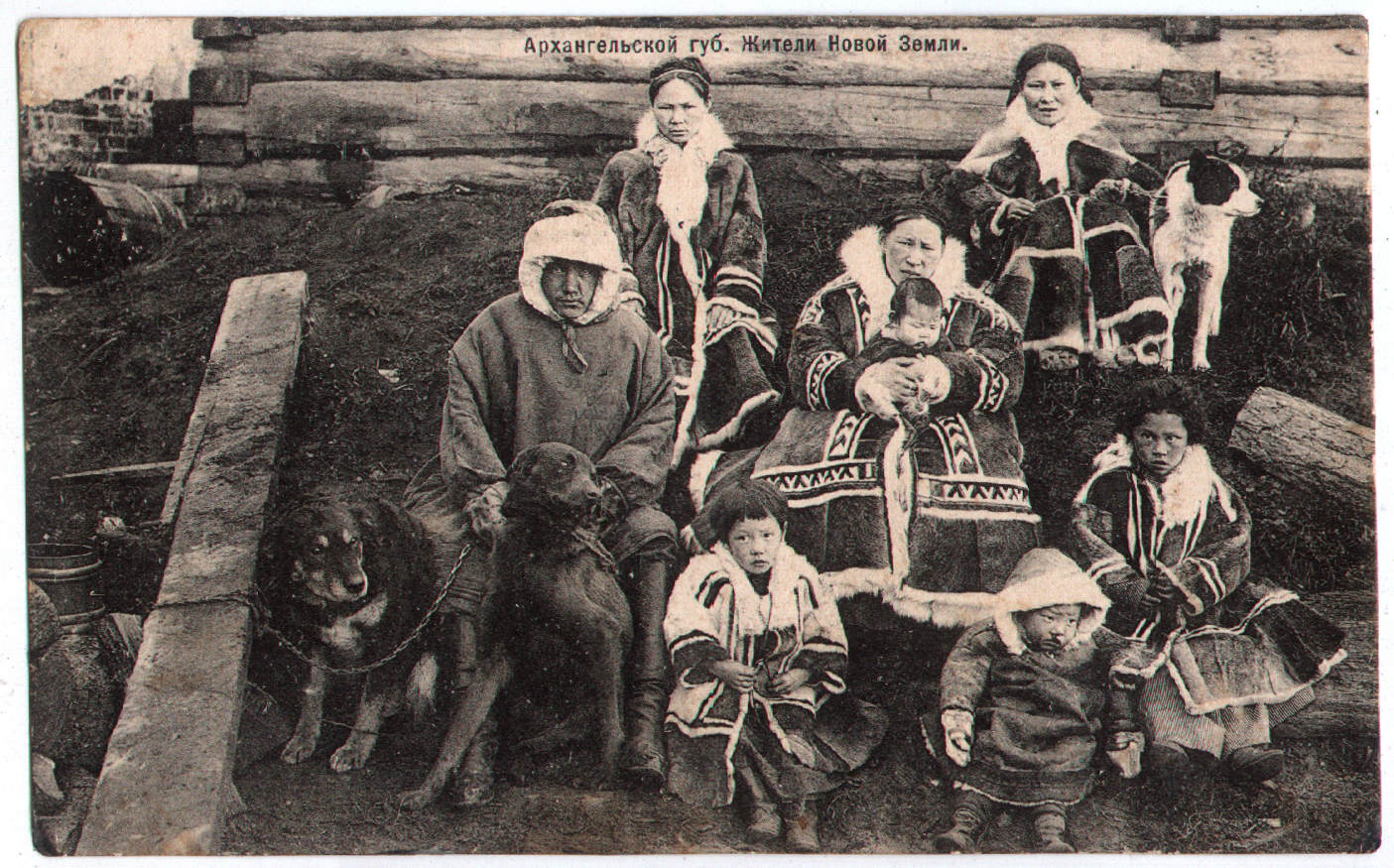
A Nenets family in Novaya Zemlya

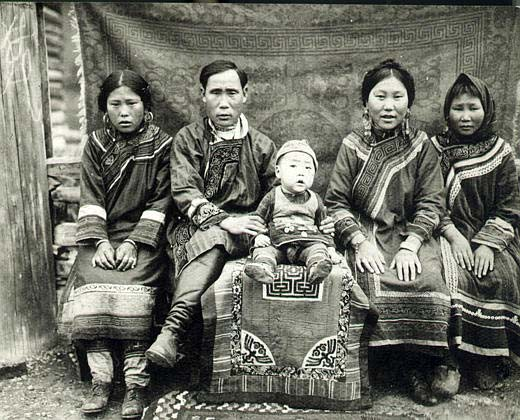
A Nanai family in traditional garb

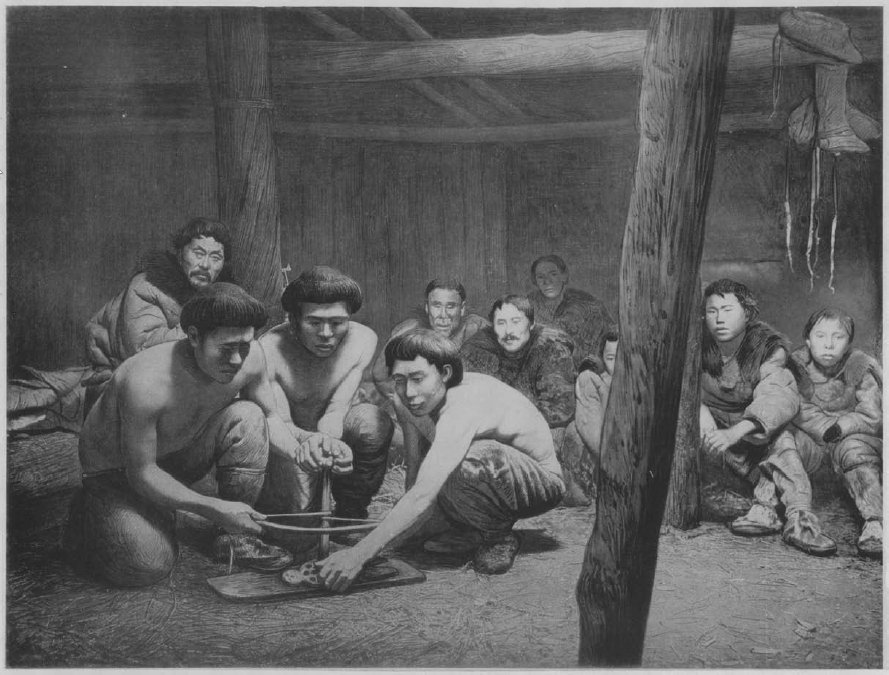
Koryak men starting a fire

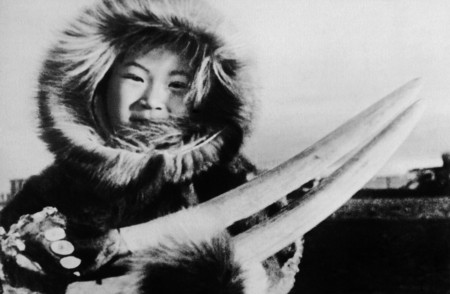
A Siberian Yupik woman holding walrus tusks

Indigenous peoples of Siberia
Ethnic group	Population (2021)	Population (2010)
Turkic	▲963,256	935,744
Siberian Turkic	956,959	928,965
Yakuts	478,409	478,085
Tuvans	295,384	263,934
Altai	78,125	74,238
Khakas	61,365	72,959
Shors	10,507	12,888
Dolgans	8,157	7,885
Tozhu Tuvans	7,278	1,858
Soyot	4,368	3,608
Tubalars	3,620	1,965
Telengits	2,730	3,712
Kumandins	2,408	2,892
Teleuts	2,217	2,643
Chelkans	1,290	1,181
Tofalar	719	762
Chulyms	382	355
Kipchak (Siberian Tatars)^{*}	6,297	6,779
Mongolic	▼460,060	461,403
Buryats	460,053	461,389
Daurs	7	14
Uralic	▲97,689	92,592
Samoyedic	53,994	49,380
Nenets	49,646	44,640
Selkup	3,458	3,649
Nganasan	687	862
Enets	201	227
Kamasins**	2	2
Ob-Ugric	43,695	43,212
Khanty	31,467	30,943
Mansi	12,228	12,269
Tungusic	▼75,844	78,462
Evenki	39,226	38,396
Evens	19,913	22,383
Nanai	11,623	12,003
Ulchs	2,472	2,765
Udege	1,325	1,496
Orochs	527	596
Negidals	481	513
Oroks	268	295
Manchus	9	15
Paleosiberian	▼36,272	37,571
Chukotko-Kamchatkan	27,947	28,985
Chukchi	16,200	15,908
Koryaks	7,485 + 96 Alyutors	7,953
Itelmens	2,596	3,193
Kamchadals	1,547	1,927
Kereks	23	4
Nivkh (Nivkh)	3,842	4,652
Ainu (Ainu)	300	109
Yukaghir	2,702	2,605
Yukaghir	1,802	1,603
Chuvans	900	1,002
Yeniseian	1,095	1,220
Kets	1,088	1,219
Yughs	7	1
Eskaleut	▼2,054	2,220
Siberian Yupik (+ Sireniks)	1,657	1,738
Aleuts	397	482
Sino-Tibetan	▼235	274
Taz	235	274
Total	▲1,635,024	1,608,266
% of Russia	1.13%	1.13%

- * Some estimates put the population of Siberian Tatars at 200,000.
- ** Some estimates put the population of Kamasins at 21.

== Ainu people ==
Ainu languages are spoken in Sakhalin, Hokkaido, the Kurils, and the Kamchatka Peninsula, as well as in the Amur region. Today, Ainu is nearly extinct, with the last native speakers remaining in Hokkaido and on Kamchatka.

== Mongolic peoples ==
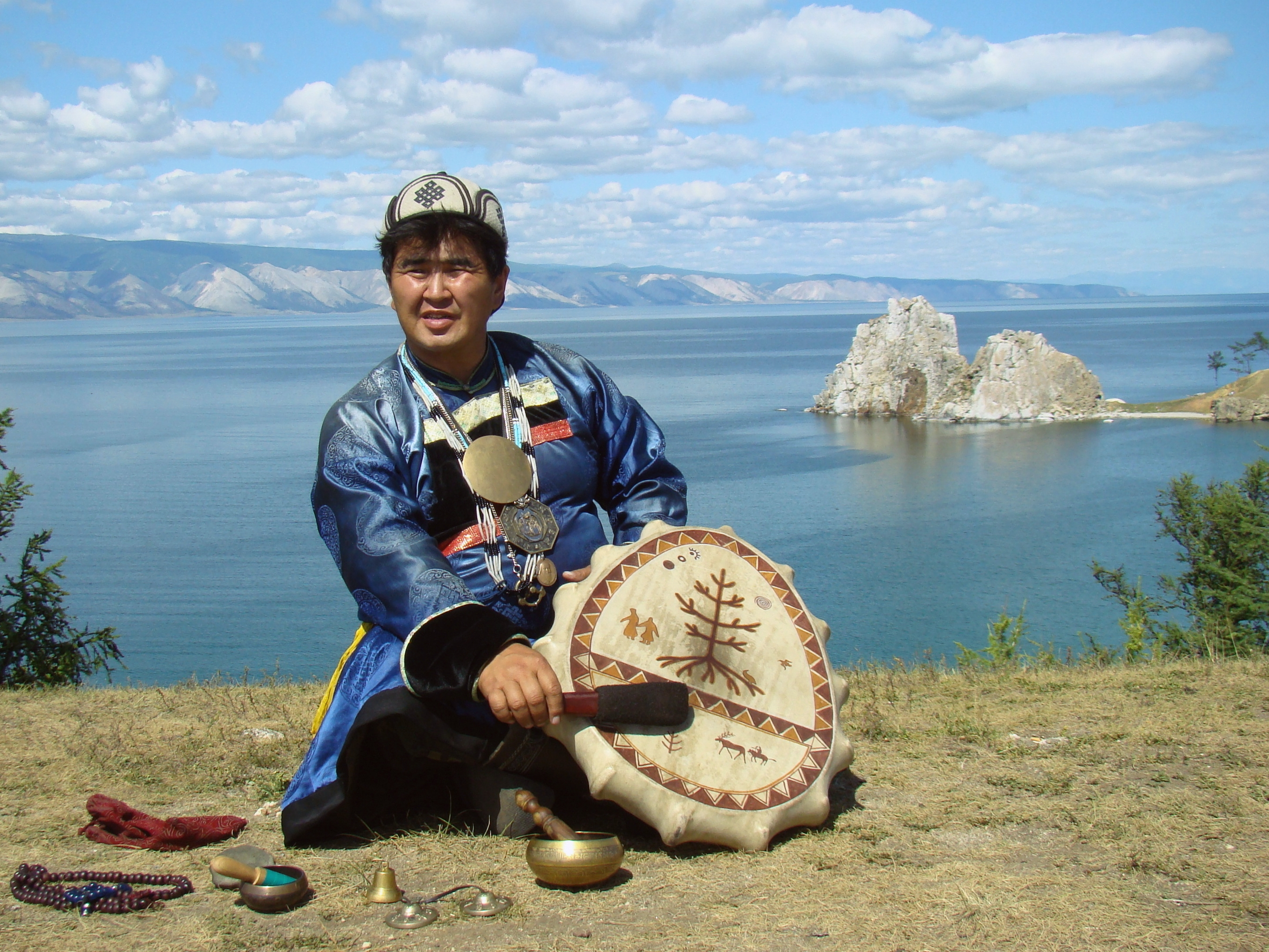
Buryat shaman of Olkhon, Lake Baikal in eastern Siberia

The Buryats number 461,389 in Russia according to the 2010 census, which makes them the second largest ethnic minority group in Siberia. They are mainly concentrated in their homeland, the Buryat Republic, a federal subject of Russia. They are the northernmost major group of the Mongols.

Buryats share many customs with their Mongolian cousins, including nomadic herding and erecting huts for shelter. Today, the majority of Buryats live in and around Ulan Ude, the capital of the republic, although many live more traditionally in the countryside. Their language is called Buryat.

In Zabaykalsky Krai of Russia, in Mongolia and China, there are also the Hamnigans—a Mongolic ethno-linguistic (sub)group as Mongolized Evenki.

In Altai Republic and Altai Krai of Russia there exists a community of Altai Oirats. The government does not write them in as a distinct ethnic group and misidentify them as Altaians or Kalmyks. They mostly live in the steppe part of the Altai Republic or around Barnaul in the Altai Krai. They number about 2,000-4,500.

== Paleosiberian peoples ==
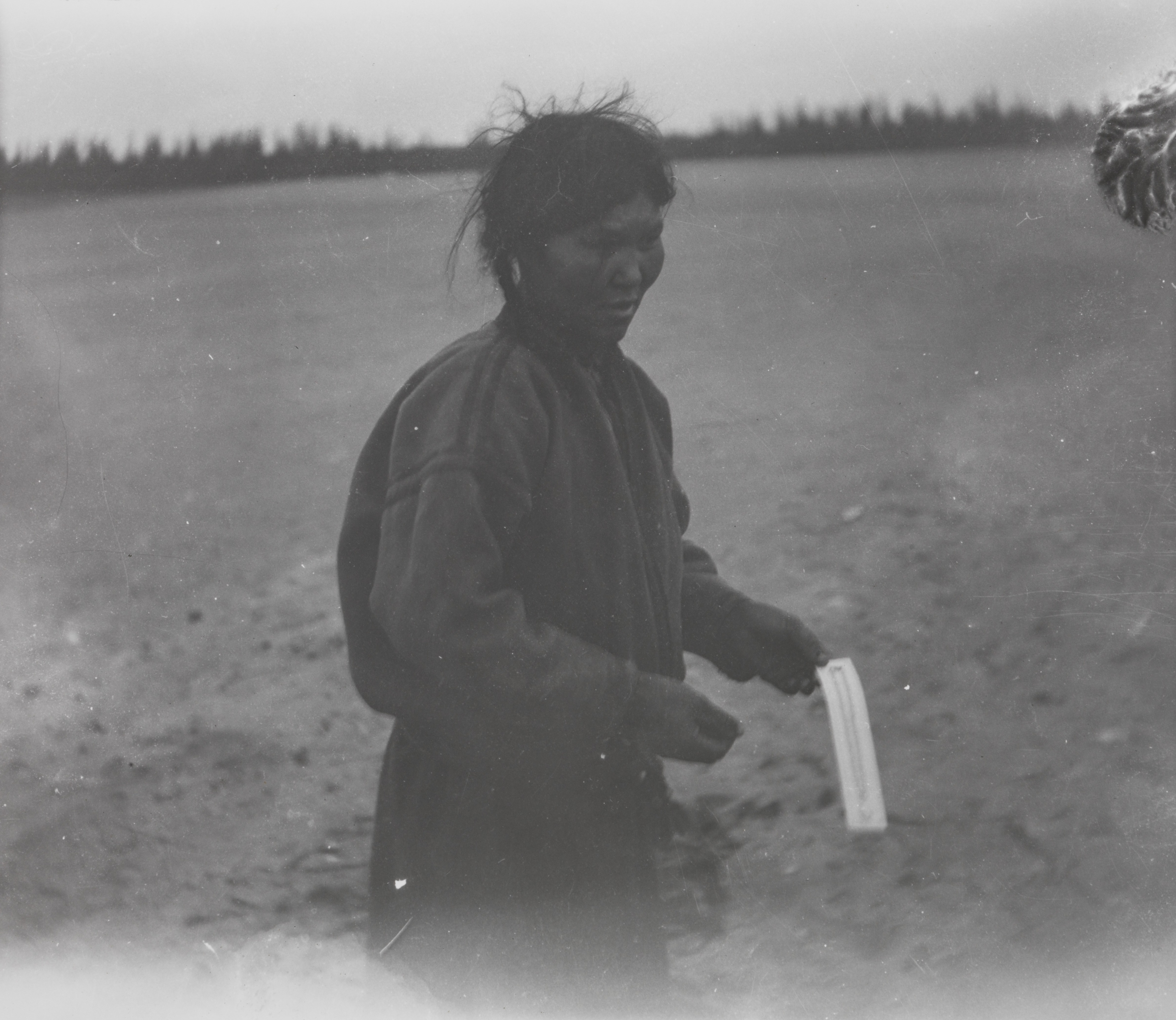
Ket woman

Four small language families and isolates, not known to have any linguistic relationship to each other, compose the Paleo-Siberian languages:

=== Chukotko-Kamchatkan ===
1. The Chukotko-Kamchatkan family, sometimes known as Luoravetlan, includes Chukchi and its close relatives, Koryak, Alutor, and Kerek. Itelmen, also known as Kamchadal, is also distantly related. Chukchi, Koryak and Alutor are spoken in easternmost Siberia by communities numbering in the dozens (Alutor) to thousands (Chukchi). Kerek is now extinct, and Itelmen is now spoken by fewer than 10 people, mostly elderly, on the west coast of the Kamchatka Peninsula.

=== Nivkh ===
2. Nivkh is spoken in the lower Amur basin and on the northern half of Sakhalin island. It has a recent modern literature and the Nivkhs have experienced a turbulent history in the last century.

=== Yeniseian ===
3. Ket is the last survivor of the Yeniseian family along the middle of the Yenisei River and its tributaries. It has recently been claimed to be related to the Na-Dene languages of North America, though this hypothesis has met with mixed reviews among historical linguists. In the past, attempts have been made to relate it to Sino-Tibetan, North Caucasian, and Burushaski.

=== Yukaghir ===
4. Yukaghir is spoken in two mutually unintelligible varieties in the lower Kolyma and Indigirka valleys. Other languages, including Chuvantsy, spoken further inland and further east, are now extinct. Yukaghir is held by some to be related to the Uralic languages.

== Tungusic peoples ==
The Evenki live in the Evenk Autonomous Okrug of Russia.

The Udege, Ulchs, Evens, and Nanai (also known as Hezhen) are also Indigenous peoples of the Russian Far East, and are known to share genetic affinity to Indigenous peoples of the Americas.

== Turkic peoples ==
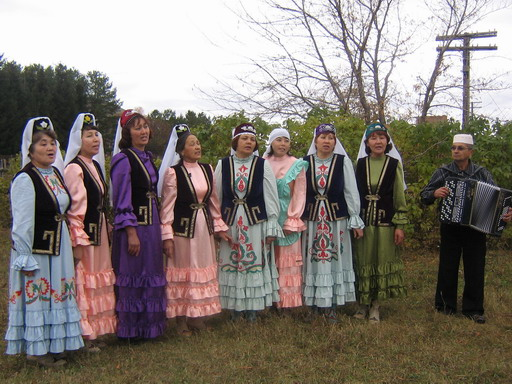
Siberian Tatars

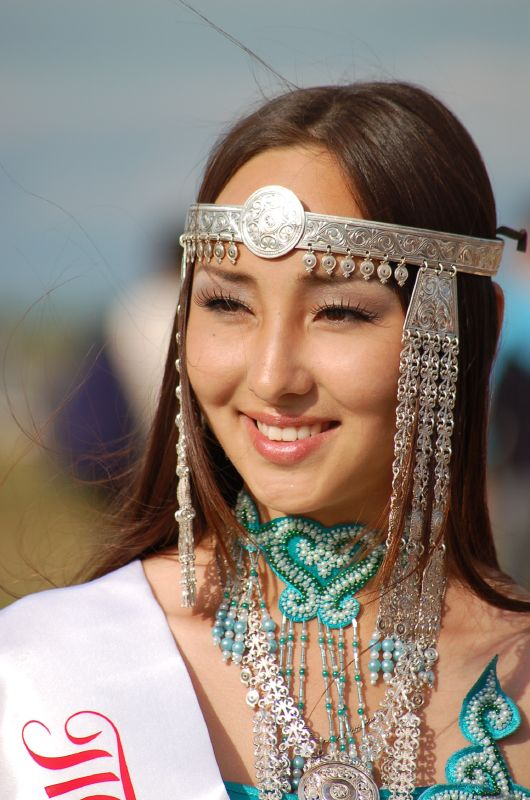
A Yakut woman in traditional dress

The Turkic peoples include the following ethnic groups:

- Altaians
  - Chelkans
  - Kumandins
  - Telengits
  - Teleuts
  - Tubalars
- Chulyms
- Dolgans
- Khakas
- Shors
- Siberian Tatars
  - Baraba Tatars
  - Chat Tatars
  - Eushta Tatars
  - Kalmak Tatars
  - Zabolotnie Tatars
  - Tyumen-Tura Tatars
  - Tobol Tatars
  - Kurdak-Sargat Tatars
  - Tara Tatars
- Soyots
- Tofalar
- Tuvans
  - Tozhu Tuvans
- Yakuts

== Uralic peoples ==
=== Ob-Ugrians ===
The Khanty (obsolete: Ostyaks) and Mansi (obsolete: Voguls) live in Khanty–Mansi Autonomous Okrug, a region historically known as "Yugra" in Russia. By 2013, oil and gas companies had already devastated much of the Khanty tribes' lands. In 2014 the Khanty-Mansi regional parliament continued to weaken legislation that had previously protected Khanty and Mansi communities. Tribes' permission was required before oil and gas companies could enter their land.

=== Samoyeds ===
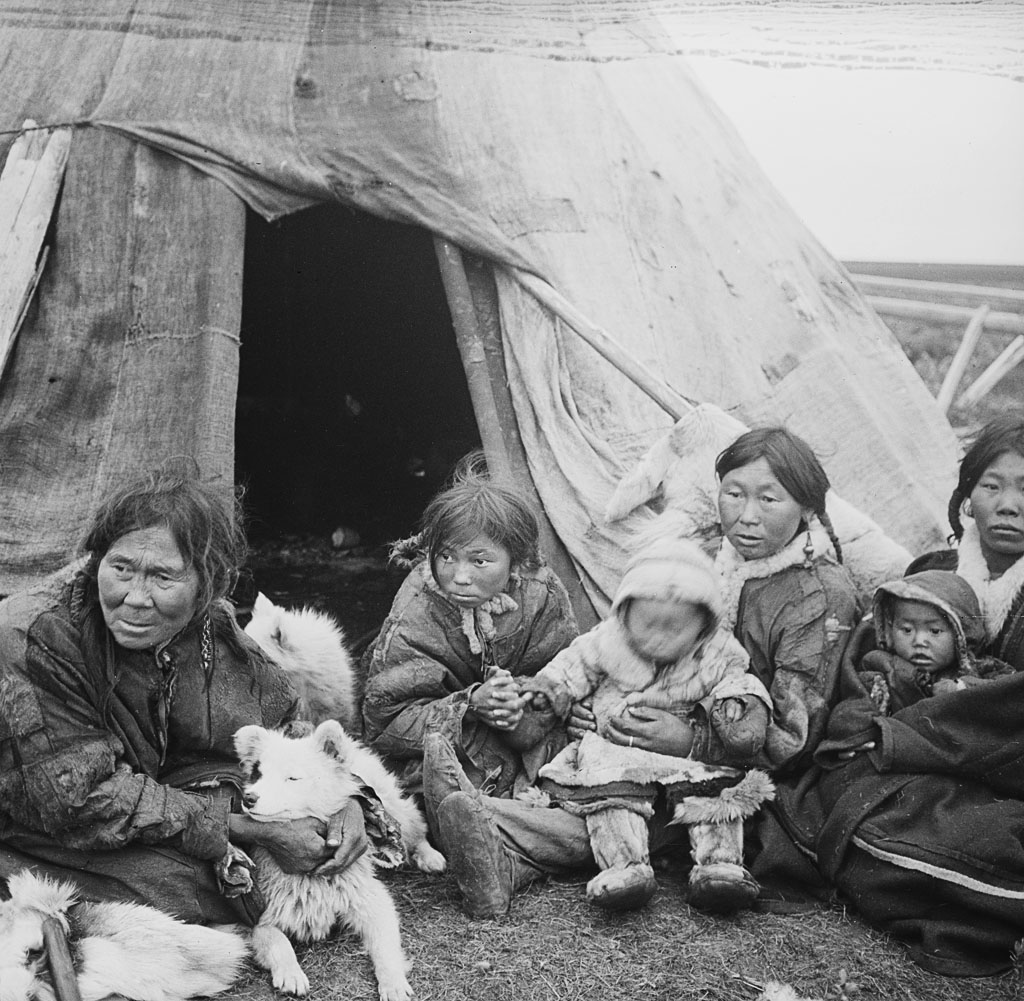
Nenets family

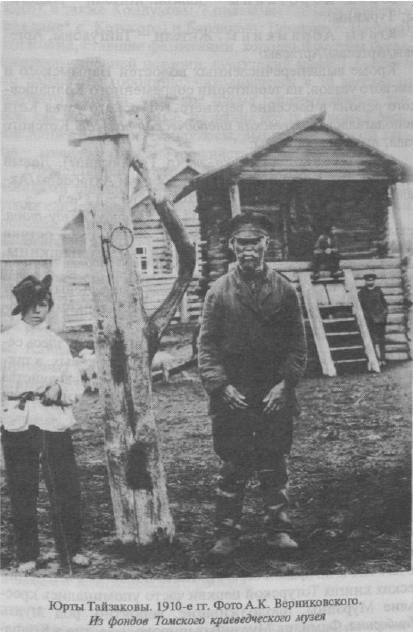
Selkup man

Samoyedic peoples include:

- Northern Samoyedic peoples
  - Nenets
  - Enets
  - Nganasan
- Southern Samoyedic peoples
  - Selkup
  - Kamasins or Kamas
  - Mator or Motor (now extinct as a distinct ethnic group)
  - Koibal (now extinct as a distinct ethnic group)

== Yukaghir group ==
Yukaghir is spoken in two mutually unintelligible varieties in the lower Kolyma and Indigirka valleys. Other languages, including Chuvantsy, spoken further inland and further east, are now extinct. Yukaghir is held by some to be related to the Uralic languages in the Uralic–Yukaghir family.

The Yukaghirs (self-designation: одул odul, деткиль detkil) are people in East Siberia, living in the basin of the Kolyma River. The Tundra Yukaghirs live in the Lower Kolyma region in the Sakha Republic; the Taiga Yukaghirs in the Upper Kolyma region in the Sakha Republic and in Srednekansky District of Magadan Oblast. By the time of Russian colonization in the 17th century, the Yukaghir tribal groups (Chuvans, Khodyns, Anauls, etc.) occupied territories from the Lena River to the mouth of the Anadyr River.

The number of the Yukaghirs decreased between the 17th and 19th centuries due to epidemics, internecine wars and Tsarist colonial policy. Some of the Yukaghirs have assimilated with the Yakuts, Evens, and Russians. Currently Yukaghirs live in the Sakha Republic and the Chukotka Autonomous Okrug of the Russian Federation. In the 2002 Census, their total number was 1,509 people, up from 1,112 in the 1989 Census.

== Genetic relationships and links to Indigenous peoples of the Americas ==
An Indigenous Siberian shaman at Kranoyarsk Regional Museum, Russia

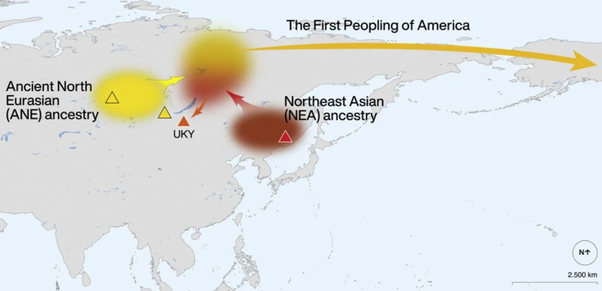
The map shows the origin of the first wave of humans into the Americas. Involved are the ANE (Ancestral Northern Eurasian, which represent a distinct Paleolithic Siberian population), and the NEA (Northeast Asians, which are an East Asian-related group). The admixture happened somewhere in Northeast Siberia.

The earliest Indigenous peoples of Siberia were hunter-gatherers distantly related to modern Europeans, and diverged from a shared ancestral population around 38kya before populating Siberia. In Siberia, they received geneflow from an East Eurasian population, most closely related to the 40kya old Tianyuan man (c. 22-50%), representing a deep sister lineage of contemporary East Asian people, giving rise to a distinct Siberian lineage known as Ancient North Eurasian (ANE). By c. 32kya, populations carrying ANE-related ancestry were probably widely distributed across northeast Eurasia. (Note: Sikora et al. (2019) model the Yana individuals as 22% East Eurasian and the remainder West Eurasian. Massilani et al. (2020) model the Yana individuals as around one-third East Eurasian and two-thirds West Eurasian.Vallini et al. (2022) model Yana as 50% West Eurasian and 50% East Eurasian.)

Around 36kya, an Ancient East Asian population diverged from other East Asians somewhere in Southern China and migrated northwards into Siberia, where they encountered and interacted with the Ancient North Eurasians to give rise to the Paleo-Siberians and the Ancestral Native Americans. The Ancestral Native Americans would become isolated in the Beringia region, and subsequently populate the Americas.

The last historical population movement can be associated with the Neo-Siberian expansion outgoing from Northeast Asia (15kya), and contributed ancestry to Indigenous groups throughout Siberia as well as to Native Americans, associated with the expansion of Paleo-Eskimo, and Eskimo-Aleut groups. Modern Indigenous peoples of Siberia derive varying degrees of ancestry from these three layers, although the Ancient North Eurasian like ancestry has been largely replaced.

Indigenous Siberians and other North Asians form a distinct cluster within wider Eurasian genetic diversity, with their closest relative affinity towards Indigenous peoples of the Americas and East Asians. Modern Indigenous Siberians also show some affinities with ancient Eastern European populations, such as the Yamnaya and Pitted Ware Cultures, although this affinity is more significant for Western Siberians than Eastern Siberians. Both Western and Eastern Siberians also have strong affinities with the Ust’-Ishim man. Although Neo-Siberians are primarily of East Asian descent, ancient and modern Altaian populations received significant geneflow from West Eurasian Steppe sources.

Present Siberian ancestry found across Eurasia and North America can be traced to a single gene pool from Middle Holocene Siberians that's best represented by Middle Neolithic Yakutia populations. These populations can be modeled as a mixture of Dzhylinda-1 (71%), which is a mixture of Ancient North Eurasian, Ancient Northern East Asian and Native American, and Early Neolithic West Baikal ancestries (29%), which is Ancient Northern East Asian-rich. Ancient Northern East Asian ancestry was presumably introduced from northeastern China.

Early Native Americans are thought to have crossed into the Americas through the Beringia land bridge between 40,000 and 13,000 years ago from modern day Siberia. Certain modern Indigenous Siberians are closely related to the Indigenous peoples of the Americas, with whom they share a common origin.

Analysis of genetic markers has also been used to link the two groups of Indigenous peoples. These studies focused on looking at markers on the Y chromosome, which is always inherited by sons from their fathers. Haplogroup Q is a unique mutation shared among most Indigenous peoples of the Americas, less among Siberian populations. Studies have found that 93.8% of Siberia's Ket people and 66.4% of Siberia's Selkup people possess the mutation, while it is largely absent from other populations in Eastern Asia or Europe.

The principal-component analysis suggests a close genetic relatedness between some North American Amerindians (the Chipewyan [Dënesųłı̨ne] and the Cheyenne) and certain populations of central/southern Siberia (particularly the Kets, Siberian Tatars, Yakuts, Selkups, and Altaians), at the resolution of major Y-chromosome haplogroups. This pattern agrees with the distribution of mtDNA haplogroup X, which is found in North America and the Altaians of southern central Siberia, but is absent from eastern Siberia.

According to a 2025 study, Native American-related Paleosiberian ancestry in continental Siberia mixed with ancestries related to Inland East Asians (China_NEastAsia_Inland_EN) and Amur River populations (China_AmurRiver_Mesolithic 14K). This created two distinct ancestries: Cis-Baikal Late Neolithic–Bronze Age and Yakutia Late Neolithic–Bronze Age ancestries. The first was associated with the expansion of Yeniseian-speaking groups whilst the second was associated with the expansion of Uralic-speaking groups. Cis-Baikal Late Neolithic-Bronze Age ancestry is closely related to present Central Siberians from the Yenisei River Basin. Meanwhile, Yakutia Late Neolithic-Bronze Age ancestry is associated with ancient and present Bering Straits populations. It is also associated with the dispersal of haplogroup N, which is common for present Uralic speaking-groups. Populations from the Amur River region always have high affinity to Amur River-related East Asian ancestry while those on the Mongolian Plateau and Baikal area share more affinity with Inland East Asian-related ancestry. However, there is minor genetic input from North Eurasian Hunter-Gatherers, who lived about ~10–4kya and are characterized by distinct West and East Eurasian admixture, into ancient and present Turkic, Mongolic and Tungusic-speaking populations from Central and Northern Eurasia, as well as pastoralists from the Late Bronze Age and Iron age such as Scythians, Sarmatians, and Xiongnu.

Another study detected a much wider distribution of Ancient Paleosiberian ancestry since the Early Holocene and is present in sites such as northern Mongolia and China.

== Culture and customs ==
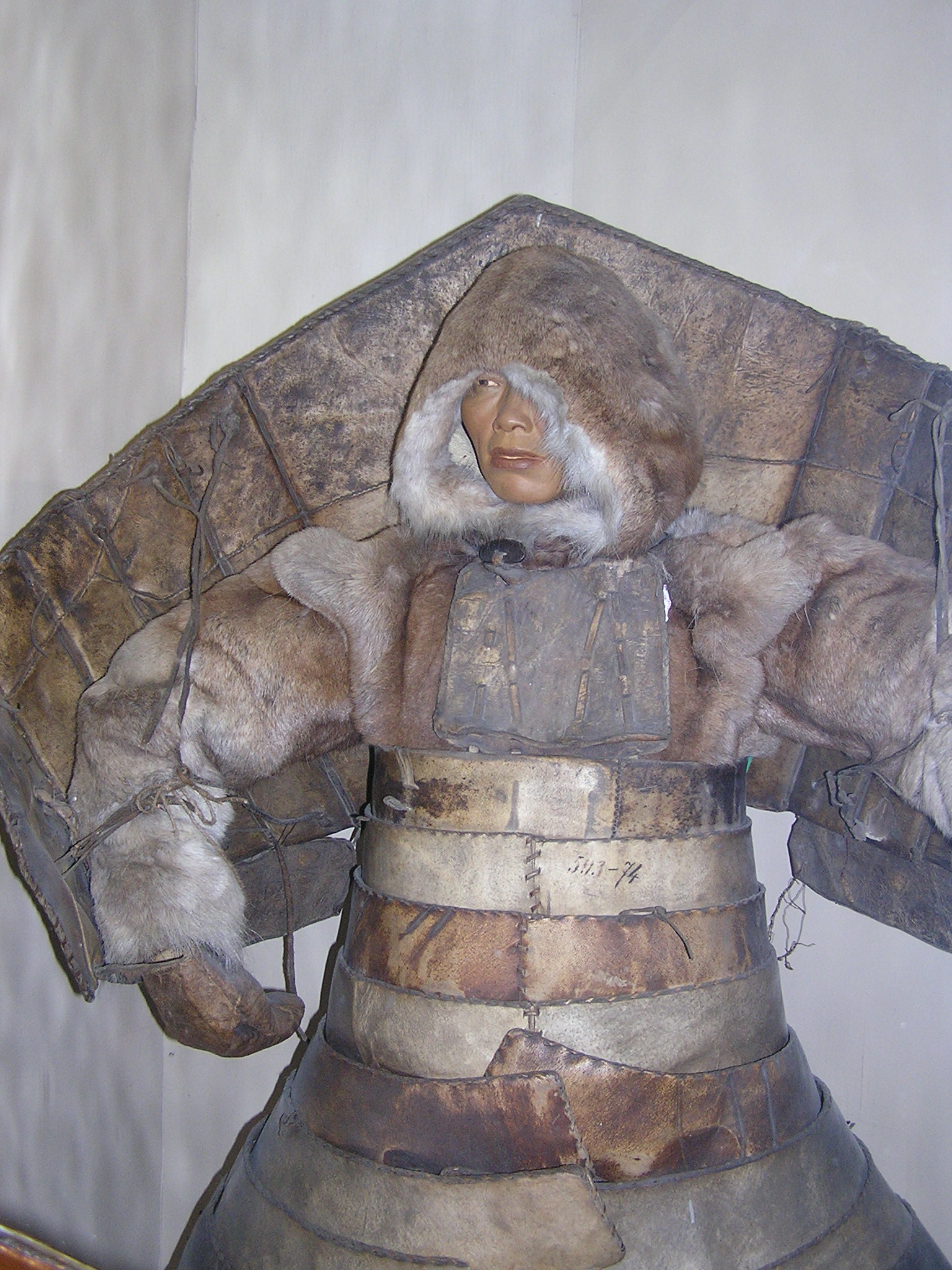
Laminar armour from hardened leather reinforced by wood and bones such as this was worn by native Siberians.

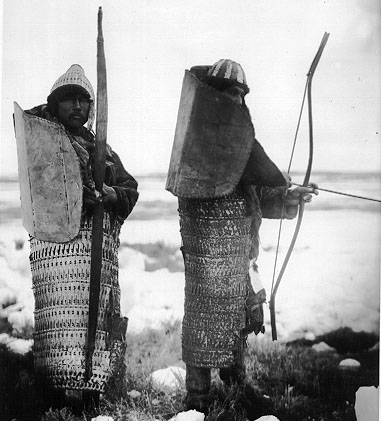
Lamellar armour traditionally worn by the Koryak people (c. 1900)

Indigenous Siberian canoe at Krasnoyarsk Regional Museum, Russia

Indigenous Siberian musical instrument used with throat singing, at Krasnoyarsk Regional Museum, Russia

Customs and beliefs vary greatly among different tribes.

The Chukchi wore laminar armour of hardened leather reinforced by wood and bones.

Kutkh (also Kutkha, Kootkha, Kutq Kutcha and other variants, Russian: Кутх), is a raven spirit traditionally revered by the Chukchi and other Siberian tribal groups. He is said to be very powerful.

Toko'yoto or the "Crab" was the Chukchi god of the sea.

Nu'tenut is the chief god of the Chukchi.

The Chukchi also respect reindeer in both mortal and holy life. They have several rituals involving them.

The Supreme Deity of the Yukaghirs is called Pon, which means "Something". He is described as very powerful.

== Notable people ==
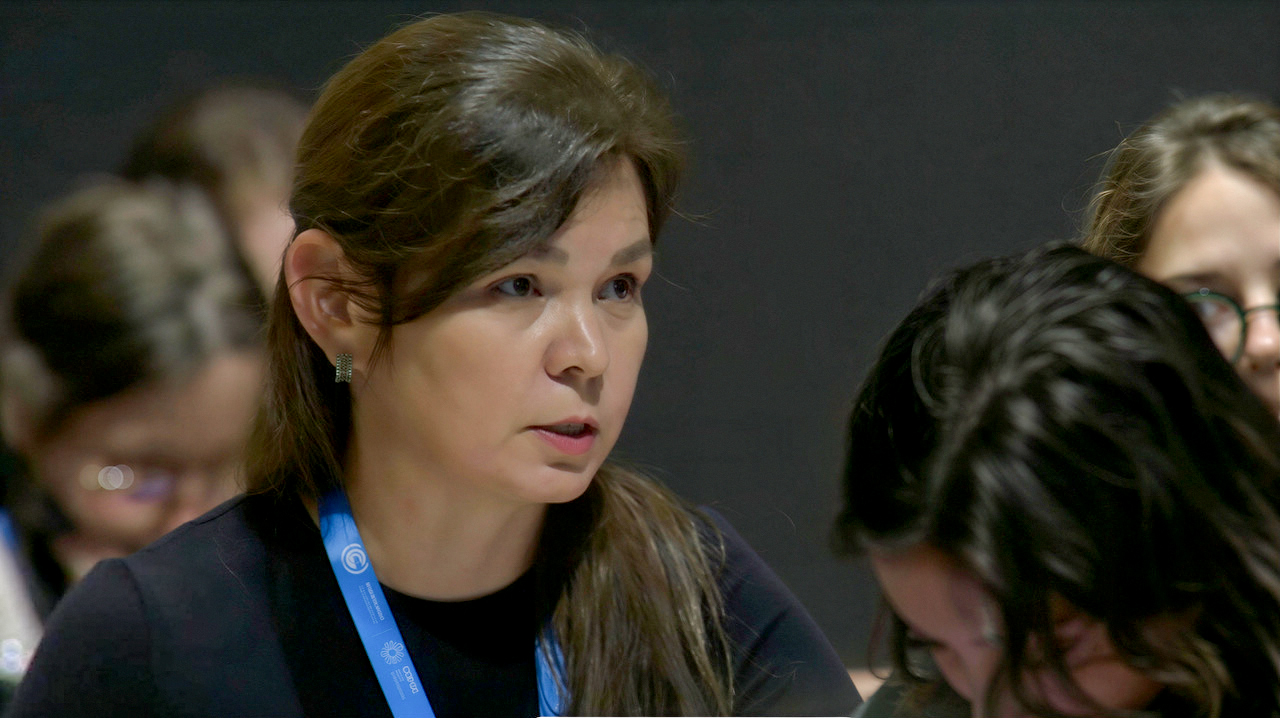
Daria Egereva at COP29 (Photo: Olga Kostrova)

On 17 December 2025, Daria Egereva, a representative of the Selkup people and the IIPFCC Co-Chair, was arrested in Russia shortly after returning from the UN Climate Change Conference in Belém and has been held in pre-trial detention in Russia since 18 December 2025. She has been accused of extremism and terrorism and faces a possible sentence of up to 20 years in prison. The Russian human rights organization Memorial has designated Egereva as a political prisoner. The IIPFCC has called for her release.

== Literature ==
- Rubcova, E. S.: Materials on the Language and Folklore of the Eskimoes, Vol. I, Chaplino Dialect. Academy of Sciences of the USSR, Moskva * Leningrad, 1954
- Menovščikov, G. A. (= Г. А. Меновщиков) (1968). "Popular Conceptions, Religious Beliefs and Rites of the Asiatic Eskimoes". In Diószegi, Vilmos (ed.). Popular beliefs and folklore tradition in Siberia. Budapest: Akadémiai Kiadó.
- Barüske, Heinz: Eskimo Märchen. Eugen Diederichs Verlag, Düsseldorf and Köln, 1969.
- Merkur, Daniel: Becoming Half Hidden / Shamanism and Initiation Among the Inuit. Acta Universitatis Stockholmiensis / Stockholm Studies in Comparative Religion. Almqvist & Wiksell, Stockholm, 1985.
- Kleivan, I. and Sonne, B.: Eskimos / Greenland and Canada. (Series: Iconography of religions, section VIII /Arctic Peoples/, fascicle 2). Institute of Religious Iconography • State University Groningen. E.J. Brill, Leiden (The Netherland), 1985. ISBN 90-04-07160-1.

== See also ==
- Ancient Beringian, Siberian Indigenous people.
- History of Siberia
- Demographics of Siberia
- First All Union Census of the Soviet Union
- Indigenous people
- List of ethnic groups
- Y-DNA haplogroups in populations of Central and North Asia
- Territory of Traditional Natural Resource Use
- Pomors
- Kola Norwegians
- Uralic languages
- Shamanism in Siberia
- Lists of Indigenous peoples of Russia
- List of small-numbered Indigenous peoples of Russia
- Indigenous small-numbered peoples of the North, Siberia and the Far East
- Circumpolar peoples
- Indigenous peoples of the Subarctic
