= North Asia =

Subregion of Asia

- Area: 13,100,000 km^{2} (5,100,000 sq mi)
- Population: 37 million (2021 census)
- Population density: 2.6 per km^{2} (7.4 per mi^{2})
- GDP (PPP): $2.1 trillion (2024)
- GDP (nominal): $743 billion (2024)
- GDP per capita: $20,200 (2024)
- Ethnic groups: Majority Slavic; Minority Tungusic, Mongolic, Turkic, and other indigenous peoples of Siberia
- Religions: Majority Orthodox Christian
- Demonym: Siberian, North Asian
- Countries: Russia
- Languages: Official languages: Russian; Other languages: Ainu; Chukotko-Kamchatkan; Eskaleut; Mongolic; Nivkh; Tungusic; Turkic; Uralic; Yeniseian; Yukaghir
- Time zones: 8 time zones: UTC+5 / MSK+2; UTC+6 / MSK+3; UTC+7 / MSK+4; UTC+8 / MSK+5; UTC+9 / MSK+6; UTC+10 / MSK+7; UTC+11 / MSK+8; UTC+12 / MSK+9
- Internet TLD: .ru
- Calling codes: Zone 7
- Largest cities: List: Barnaul; Chelyabinsk; Irkutsk; Kemerovo; Khabarovsk; Krasnoyarsk; Novokuznetsk; Novosibirsk (largest); Omsk; Tomsk; Tyumen; Vladivostok; Yakutsk; Yekaterinburg; Chita
- UN M49 codes: 151 – Eastern Europe; 150 – Europe; 001 – World

North Asia

Russian name
- Russian: Северная Азия
- Romanization: Severnaya Aziya

North Asia or Northern Asia (Russian: Северная Азия) is the northern region of Asia, which is defined in geographical terms and consists of three federal districts of Russia: Ural, Siberian, and the Far Eastern. North Asia is bordered by the Arctic Ocean to its north; by Eastern Europe to its west; by Central Asia and East Asia to its south; and by the Pacific Ocean and Northern America to its east. It covers an area of 13,100,000 square kilometers (5,100,000 sq mi), or 8.8% of Earth's total land area; and is the largest subregion of Asia by area, occupying approx. 29.4% of Asia's land area, but is also the least populated, with a population of around 37 million, accounting for merely 0.74% of Asia's population.

Topographically, the region is dominated by the Eurasian Plate, except for its eastern part, which lies on the North American, Amurian, and Okhotsk Plates. It is divided by three major plains: the West Siberian Plain, Central Siberian Plateau, and Verhoyansk-Chukotka collision zone. The Uralian orogeny in the west raised Ural Mountains, the informal boundary between Asia and Europe. Tectonic and volcanic activities are frequently occurred in the eastern part of the region as part of the Ring of Fire, evidenced by the formation of island arcs such as the Kuril Islands and ultra-prominent peaks such as Klyuchevskaya Sopka, Kronotsky, and Koryaksky. The central part of North Asia is a large igneous province called the Siberian Traps, formed by a massive eruption which occurred 250 million years ago. The formation of the traps coincided with the Permian–Triassic extinction event.

Historically, it has been home to various East Asian-related ethnic groups from a diverse range of language families, including the Ainu, Chukotko-Kamchatkan, Mongolic, Nivkh, Tungusic, Turkic, Uralic, Yeniseian, Yukaghir, and Eskaleut peoples. However, due to the Russian conquest of Siberia, the entirety of North Asia was colonised and incorporated into Russia. European cultural influences, specifically Russian, are predominant in the entire region, due to it experiencing Russian emigration from Europe starting from the 16th century. Slavs and other Indo-Europeans make up the vast majority of North Asia's population, and over 85% of the region's population is of European descent, whereas the Indigenous peoples comprise only about 5% of the North Asian population.

== History ==
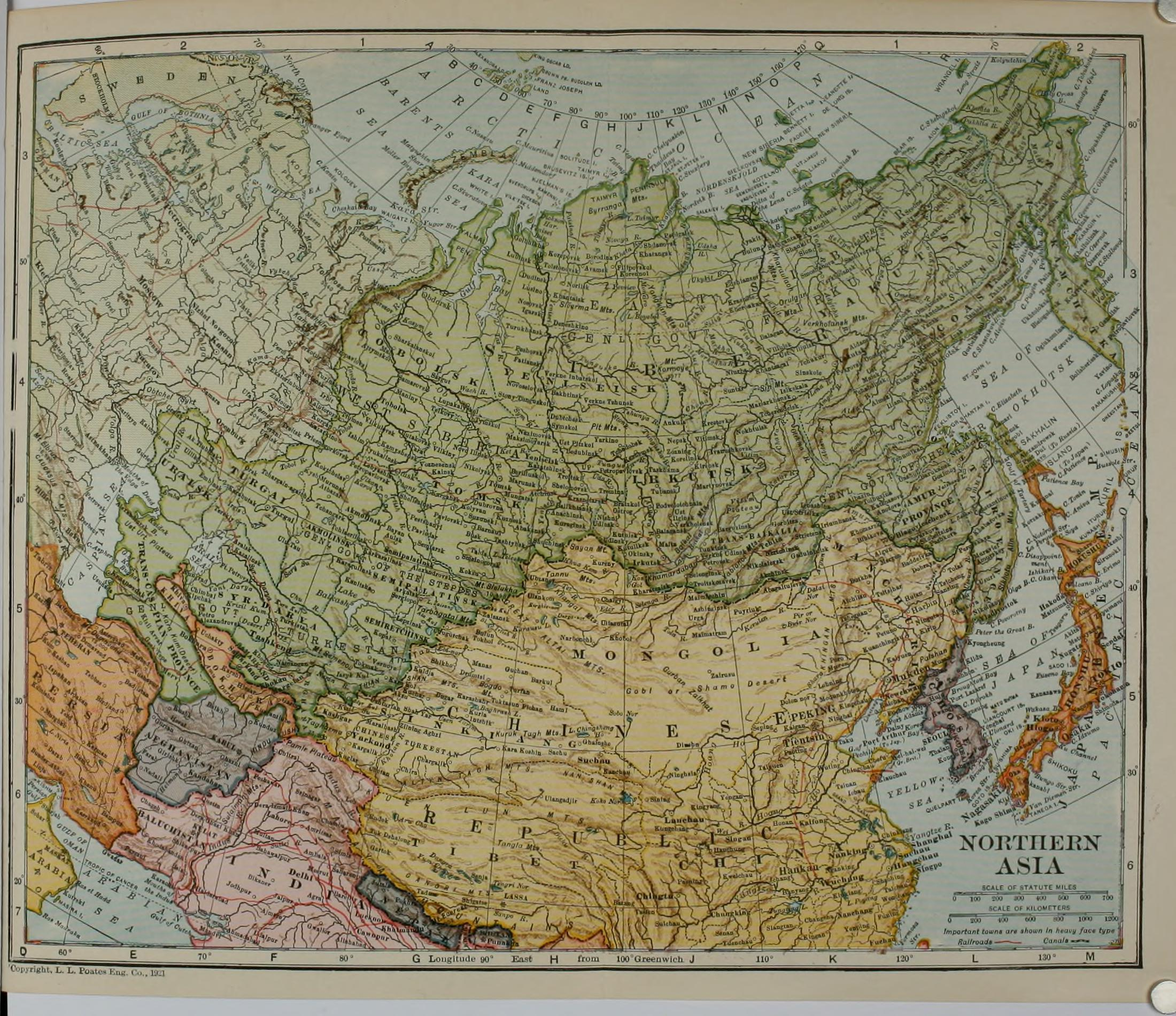
Map of Northern Asia in 1921

=== Antiquity and pre-colonization ===
The region was first populated by hominins in the Late Pleistocene, approximately 100,000 years ago, and modern humans are confirmed to arrived in the region by 45,000 years ago with the first humans in the region having West Eurasian origins.

Its Neolithic culture is characterized by characteristic stone production techniques and the presence of pottery of eastern origin. The Bronze Age began during the 3rd millennium BCE, with influences of Indo-Iranian cultures as evidenced by the Andronovo culture. During the 1st millennium BCE, polities such as the Scythians and Xiongnus emerged in the region, who often clashed with its Persian and Chinese neighbors in the south.

The Göktürks dominated southern Siberia during the 1st millennium CE, while in the early 2nd millennium, the Mongol Empire and its successor states ruled the region. The Khanate of Sibir was one of the last independent Turkic states in North Asia before its conquest by the Tsardom of Russia in the 16th century. Russia would then gradually annex the region into its territory until the Convention of Peking was signed in 1860.

=== Soviet consolidation and conflict ===
Following the Russian Civil War, the Soviet Union solidified control over Siberia and the Russian Far East. The Far Eastern Republic, which had served as a buffer state, was dissolved and absorbed by the Russian SFSR in 1922, officially bringing the region under Soviet authority by 1923.

Throughout the 1930s, the Soviet Union fortified the region militarily due to increasing tensions with Japan. The Soviet–Japanese border conflicts culminated in the Battles of Khalkhin Gol in 1939, where Soviet General Georgy Zhukov led a decisive victory over Japanese forces, leading to the Soviet–Japanese Neutrality Pact in 1941. (Note: See Soviet–Japanese border conflicts for further information)

=== Cold War industrialization ===
After World War II, North Asia played a critical role in Soviet industrialization and military strategy. Major industrial centers were developed in Norilsk, Novosibirsk, and Irkutsk, supported by labor from the Gulag system. (Note: See History of Siberia for further information)

The Trans-Siberian Railway, which spanned from Moscow to Vladivostok, became vital for transporting natural resources such as timber, coal, and metals to western parts of the USSR.

=== Post-Soviet era ===
With the collapse of the Soviet Union in 1991, North Asia faced economic turmoil and depopulation. Many towns built around single industries experienced sharp decline.

In the 2000s and 2010s, the region gained strategic importance due to its vast reserves of natural gas, oil, and mineral resources. Russia began expanding infrastructure such as the Power of Siberia gas pipeline to China, marking a strategic pivot to Asia.

As of the 2020s, the Russian government continues efforts to develop the Russian Far East through the "Far Eastern Hectare" program and special economic zones, though progress remains mixed due to geographic challenges and demographic decline.

== Geography ==
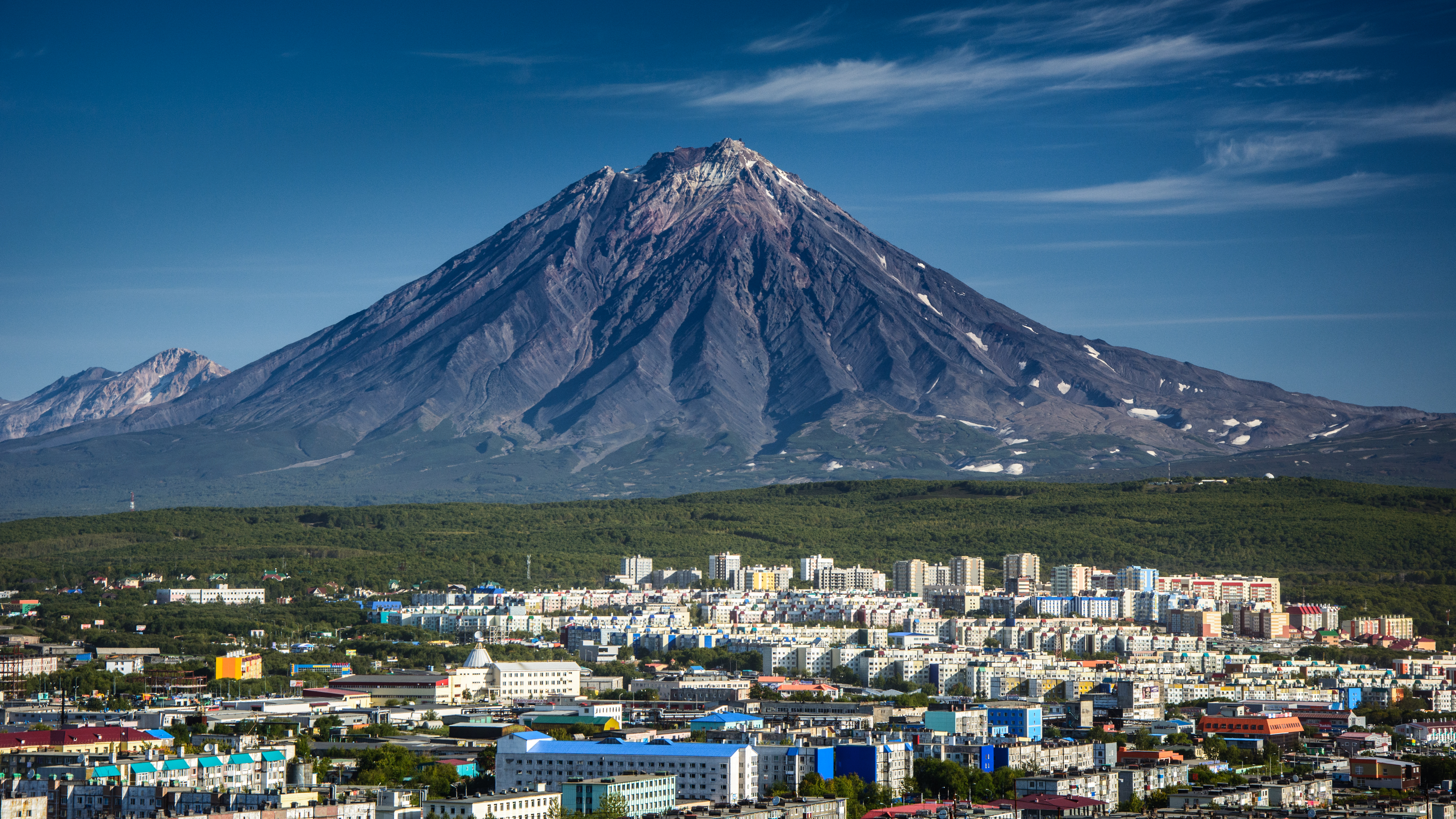
Kamchatka Peninsula

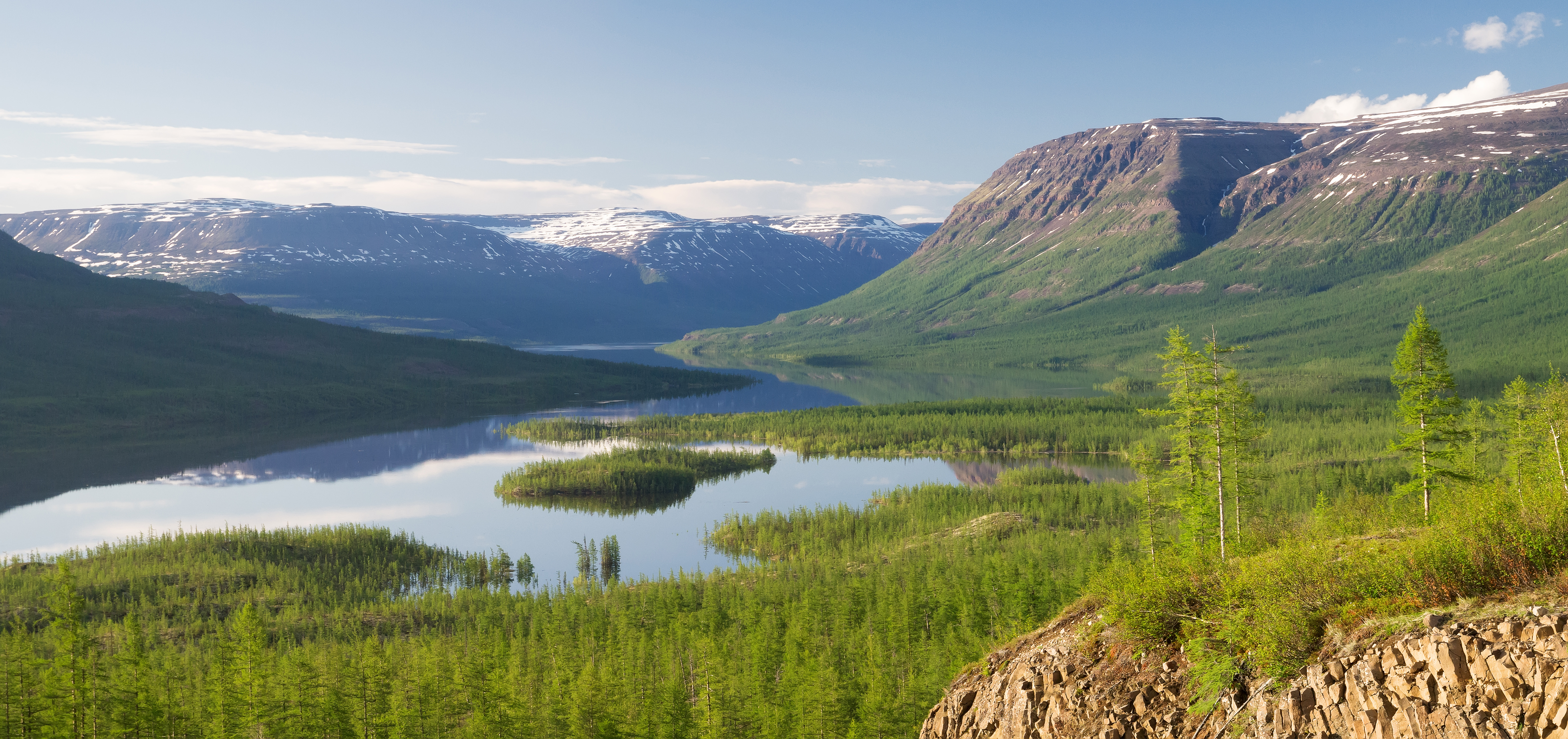
Putorana Plateau

For geographical and statistical reasons, the United Nations geoscheme and various other classification schemes will not subdivide countries, and thus place all of Russia in Europe or the Eastern Europe subregion. There are no mountain chains in North Asia to prevent air currents from the Arctic flowing down over the plains of Siberia and Turkestan.

The plateau and plains of North Asia comprise the West Siberian Lowlands; the Angara Shield, with the Taymyr Peninsula, the coastal lowlands (the East Siberian Lowland and the North Siberian Lowland), and the Central Siberian Plateau (the Anabar Plateau, the Lena Plateau, the Lena-Angara Plateau, the Putorana Plateau, the Tunguska Plateau, and the Vilyuy Plateau); and the Central Yakutian Lowland. Western Siberia is usually regarded as the Northwest Asia, Kazakhstan also sometimes included there.

=== Geomorphology ===
The geomorphology of North Asia in general is imperfectly known, although the deposits and mountain ranges are well known.

To compensate for new sea floor having been created in the Siberian basin, the whole of the Eurasian Plate has pivoted about a point in the New Siberian Islands, causing compression in the Verkhoyansk mountains, which were formed along the eastern margin of the Angara Shield by tectonic uplift during the Mesozoic Era. There is a southern boundary to this across the northern margin of the Alpine folds of Afghanistan, India, Nepal, and Bhutan, which at the east of Brahmaputra turns to run south towards the Bay of Bengal along the line of the Naga Hills and the Arakan Yoma, continues around Indonesia, and follows the edge of the continental shelf along the eastern seaboard of China. The Eurasian Plate and the North American Plate meet across the neck of Alaska, following the line of the Aleutian Trench, rather than meeting at the Bering Straits.

North Asia is built around the Angara Shield, which lies between the Yenisey River and the Lena River. It developed from fragments of Laurasia, whose rocks were mainly Precambrian crystalline rocks, gneisses, and schists, and Gondwana. These rocks can be found in the Angara Shield, Inner Mongolian-Korean Shield, Ordes Shield, and Southeast Asia Shield. The fragments have been subject to orogenesis around their margins, giving a complex of plateaus and mountain ranges. One can find outcrops of these rocks in unfolded sections of the Shields. Their presence has been confirmed below Mesozoic and later sediments.

There are three main periods of mountain building in North Asia, although it has occurred many times. The outer fold mountains that are on the margins of the Shields and that only affected Asia north of the line of the Himalayas, are attributed to the Caledonian and Hercynian orogenies of the late Palaeozoic Era. The Alpine orogeny caused extensive folding and faulting of Mesozoic and early Tertiary sediments from the Tethys geosyncline. The Tibetan and Mongolian Plateaus, and the structural basins of Tarim, Qaidam, and Junggar, are delimited by major east–west lithospheric faults that were probably the results of stresses caused by the impact of the Indian Plate against Laurasia. Erosion of the mountains caused by this orogeny has created a large amount of sediment, which has been transported southwards to produce the alluvial plains of India, China, and Cambodia, and which has also been deposited in large amounts in the Tarim and Junggar basins.

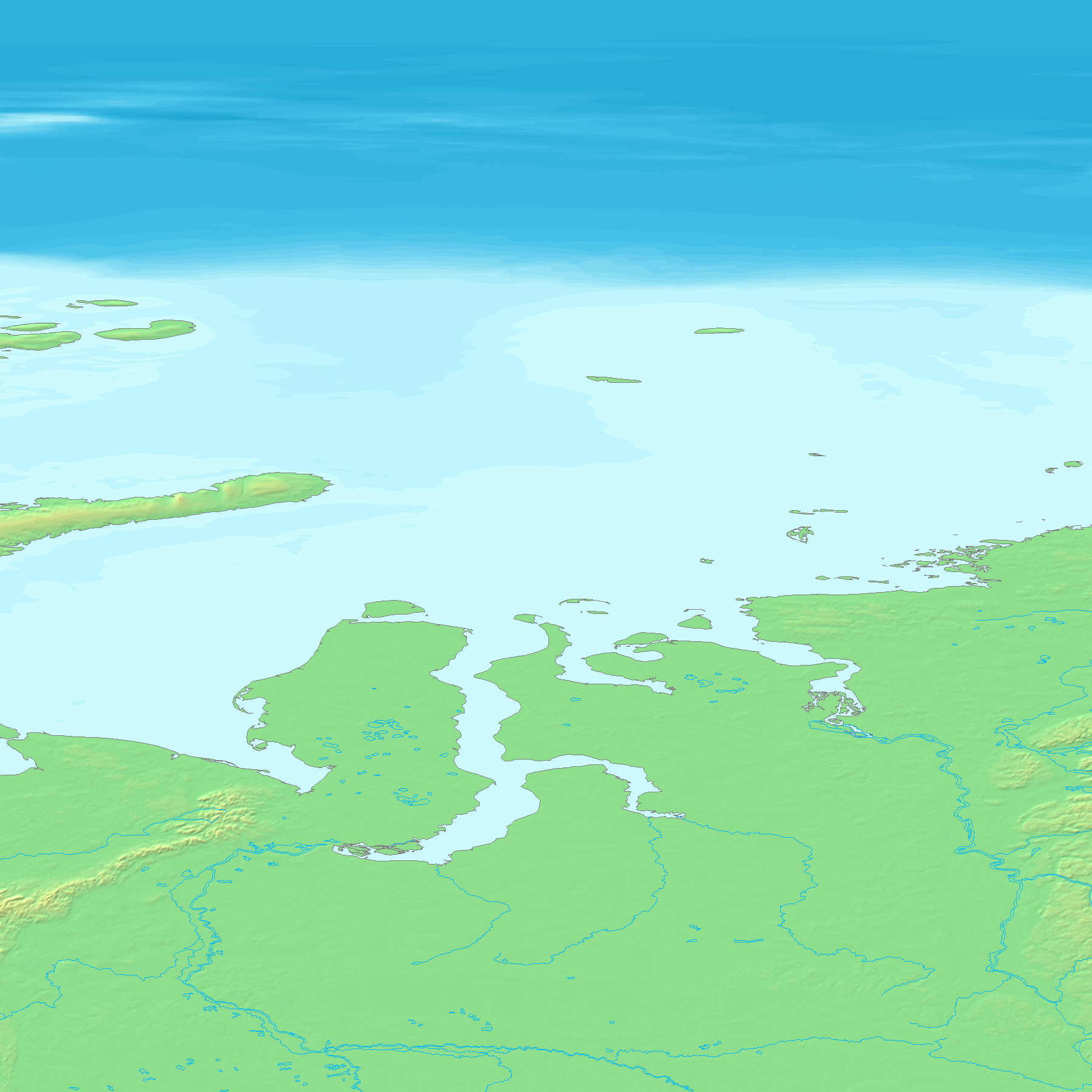

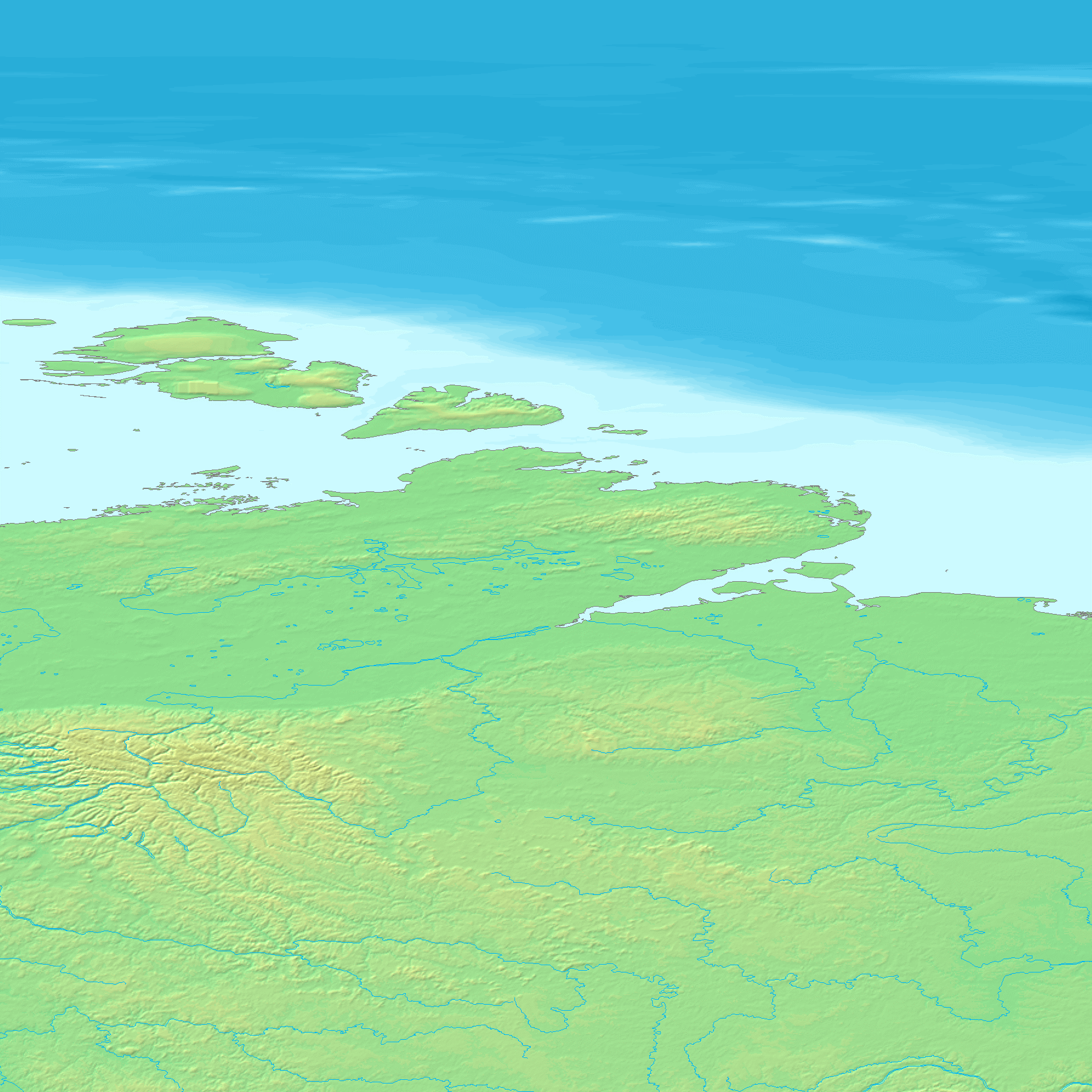

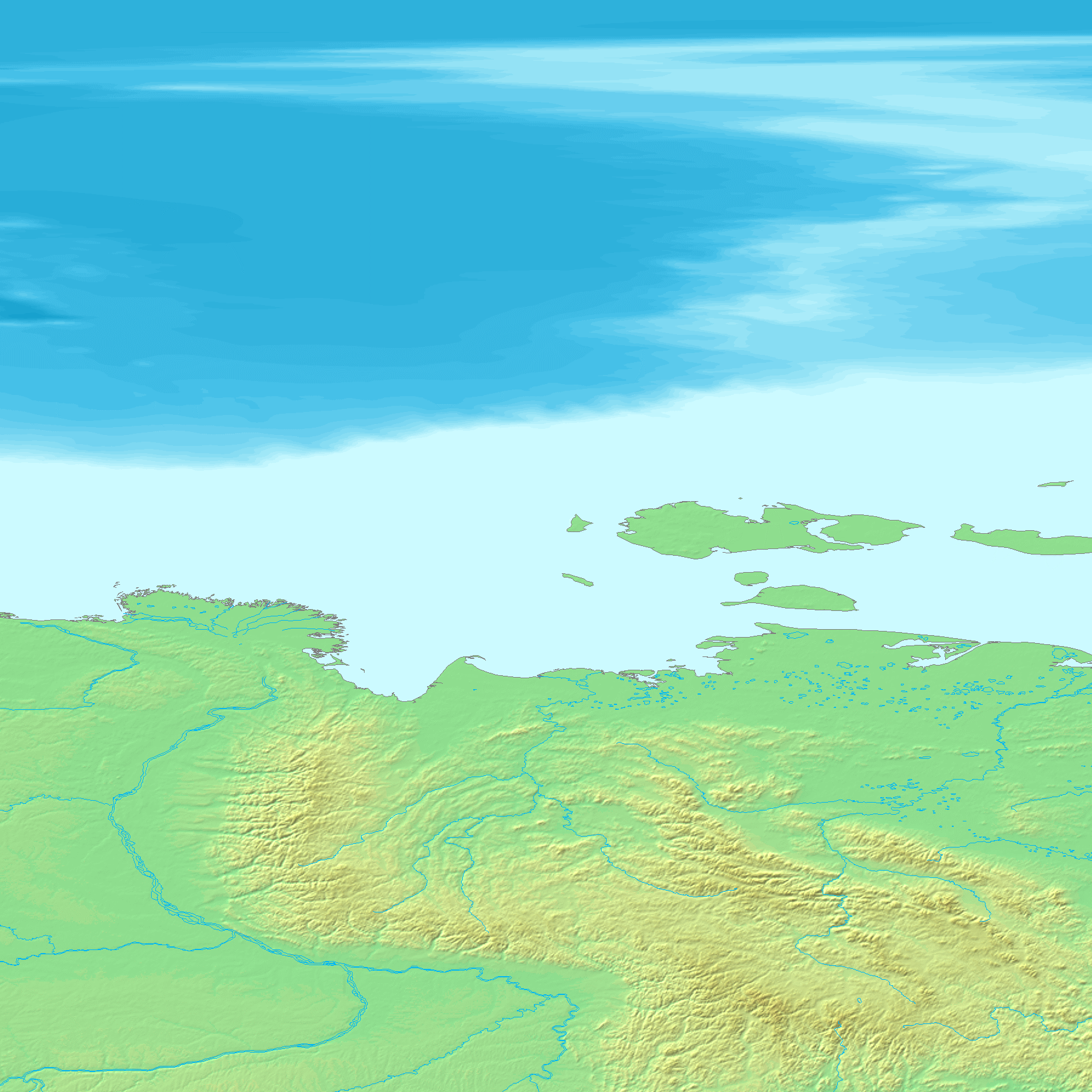

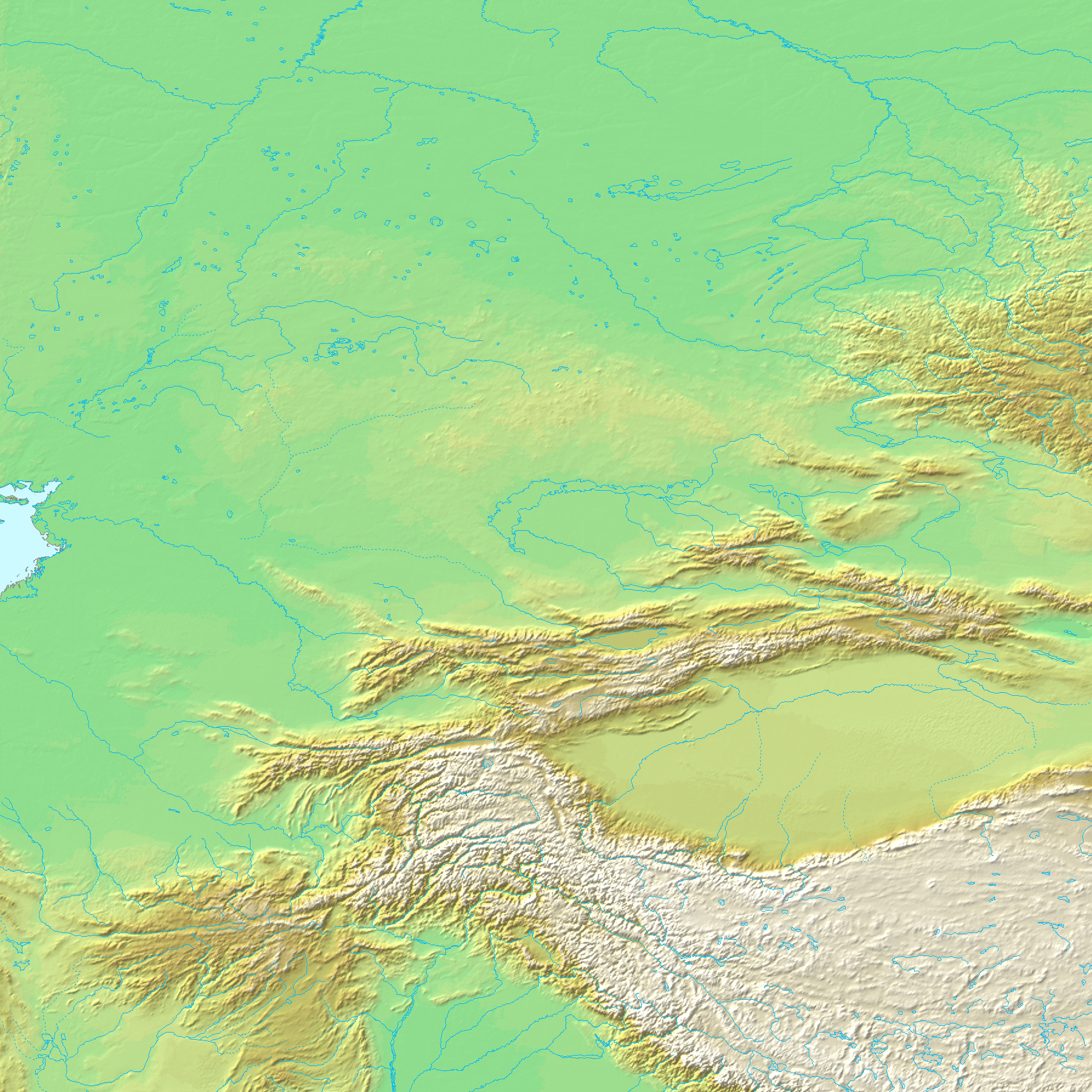

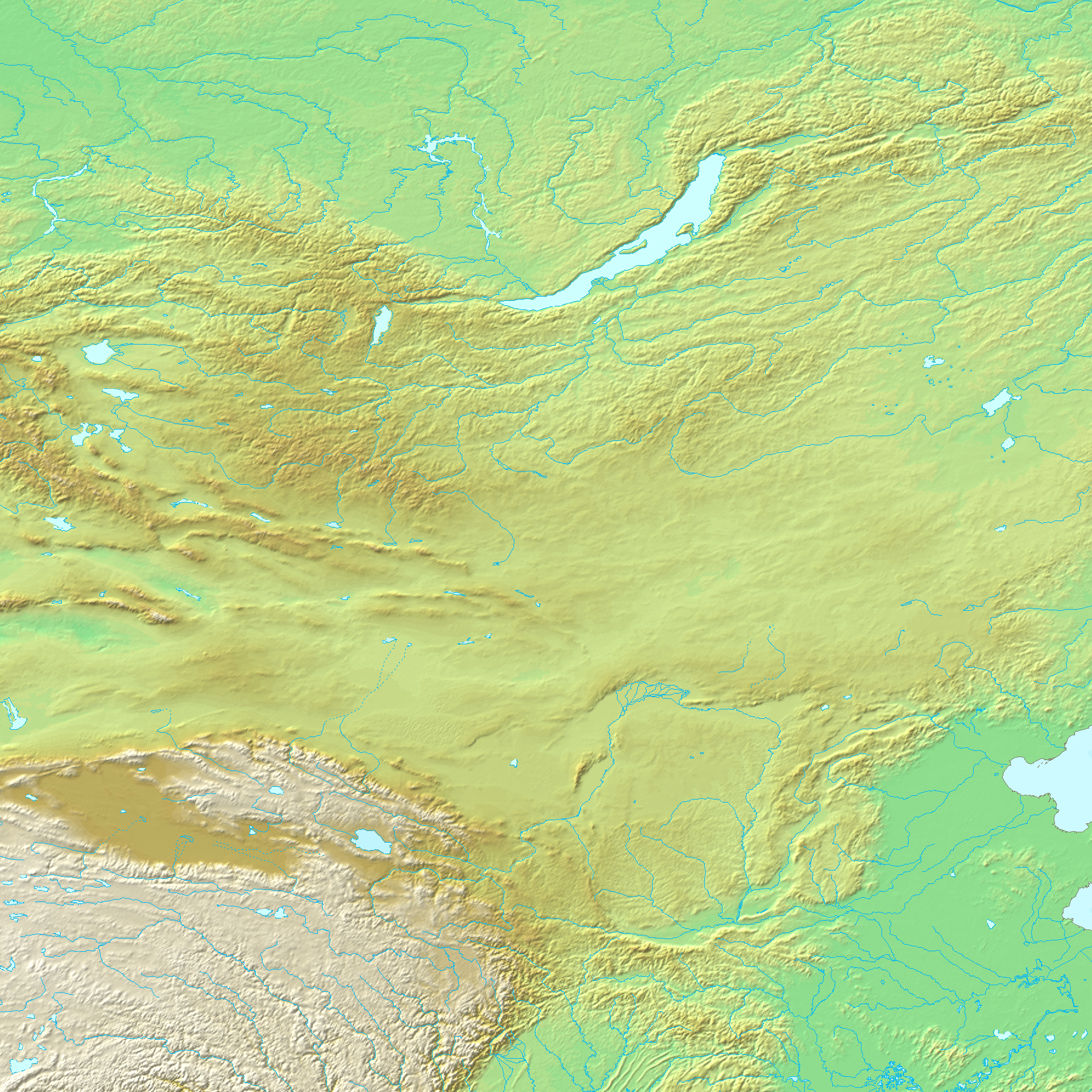

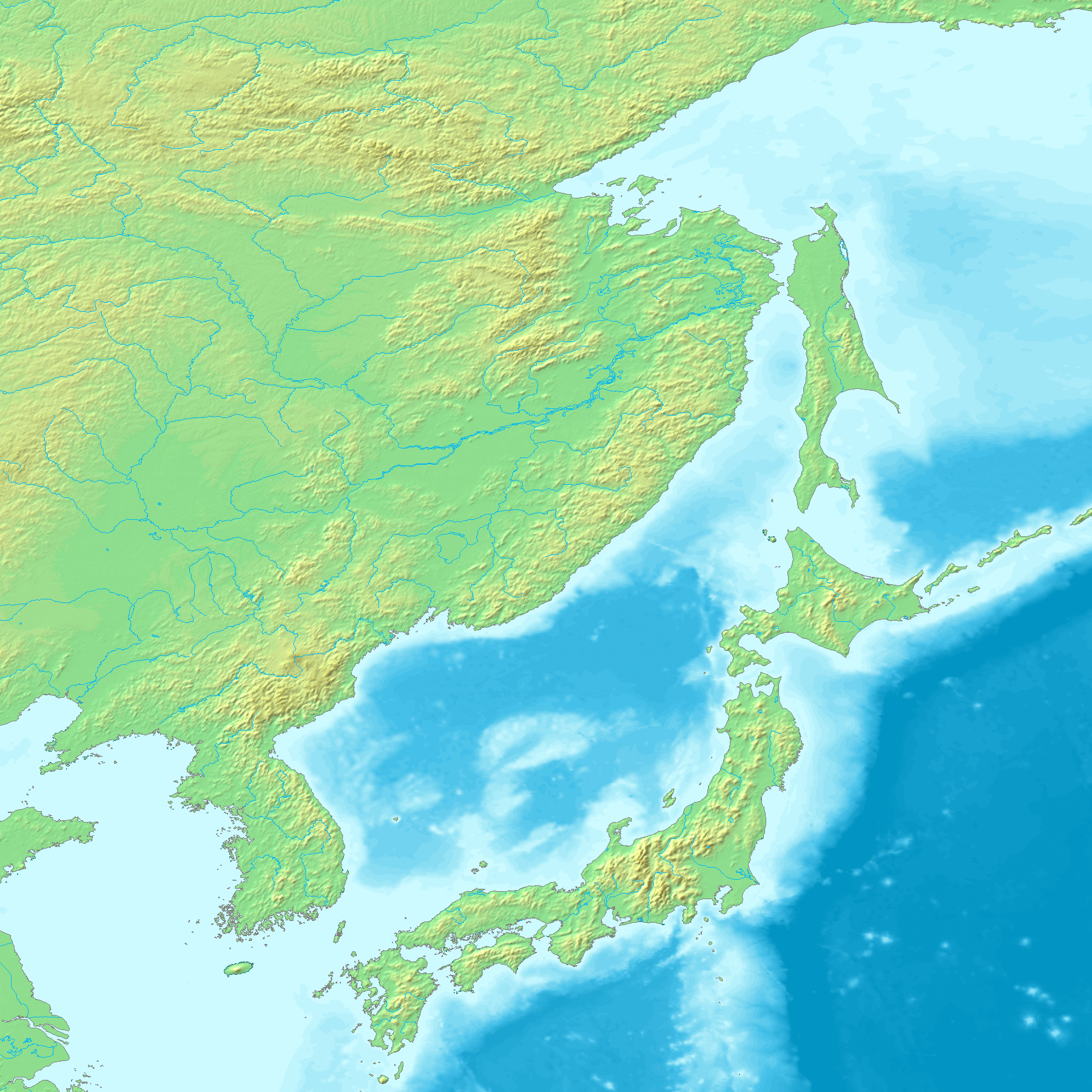

Physical map of Northern Asia (with parts of Central and East Asia)

North Asia was glaciated in the Pleistocene, but this played a less significant part in the geology of the area compared to the part that it played in North America and Europe. The Scandinavian ice sheet extended to the east of the Urals, covering the northern two thirds of the Ob Basin and extending onto the Angara Shield between the Yenisei and Lena Rivers. There are legacies of mountain glaciation to be found on the east Siberian mountains, on the mountains of the Kamchatka Peninsula, on the Altai, on Tian Shan, and on other small areas of mountains, ice caps remain on the islands of Severnaya Zemlya and Novaya Zemlya, and several Central Asian mountains still have individual glaciers. North Asia itself has permafrost, ranging in depths from 30 to 600 meters (90 to 1800 ft) and covering an area of 9.6 million km^{2}(3.8 million sq mi).

Several of the mountainous regions are volcanic, with both the Koryak Mountains and the Kamchatka Peninsula having active volcanoes. The Anadyr Plateau is formed from igneous rocks. The Mongolian Plateau has an area of basaltic lavas and volcanic cones.

The Angara Shield also underlies the lowlands of the Ob River, but to the south and east in the Central Asian Mountains and in the East Siberian Mountains there are folded and faulted mountains of Lower Palaeozoic rocks.

== Demographics ==
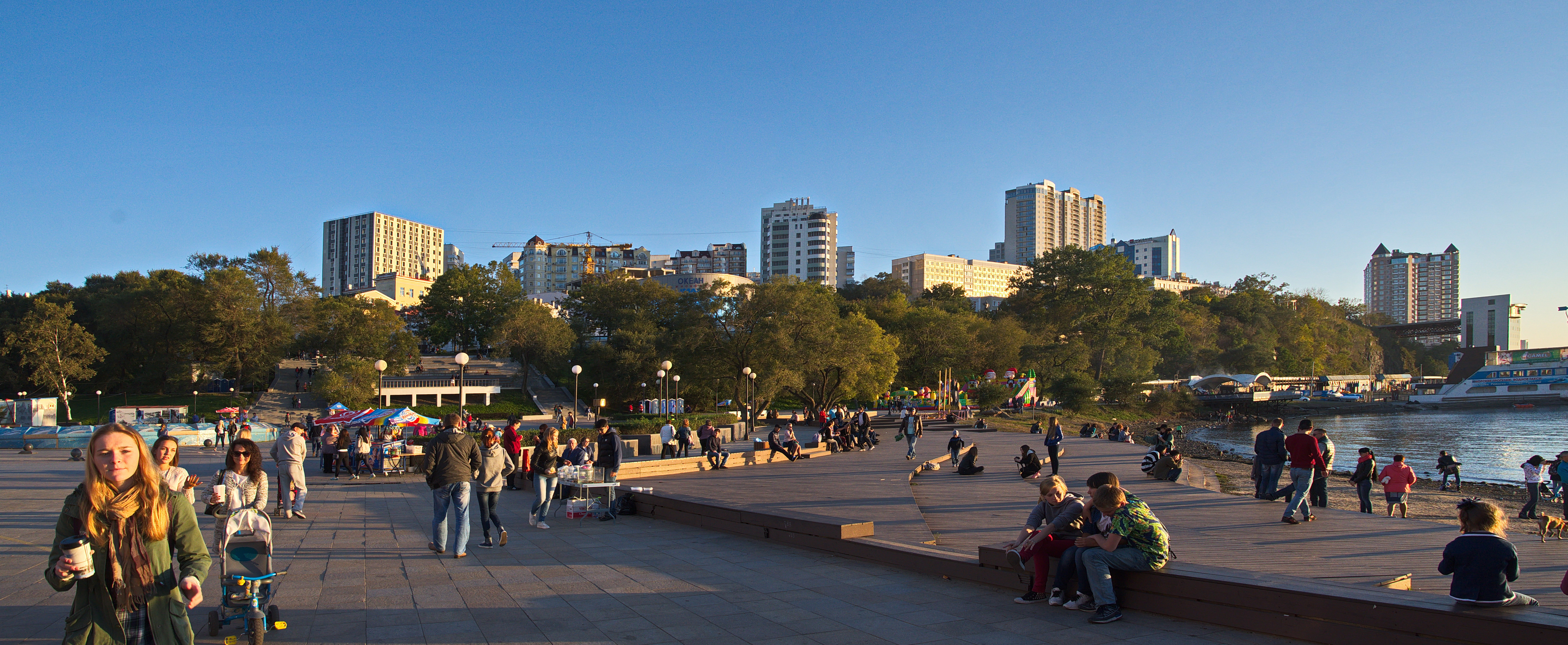
Russians in Vladivostok, on Russia's Pacific Coast

Most estimates are that there are around 33 million Russian citizens living east of the Ural Mountains, a widely recognized geographical divide between Europe and Asia. Of these Russian citizens of Siberia, most are Slavic-origin Russians and Russified Ukrainians. The Turkic peoples who are native to some parts of Siberia and native Tungusic and Mongolic peoples are now a minority in North Asia due to the Russification process during the last three centuries. Russian census records indicate they make up only an estimated 10% of the region's population, with the largest being the Buryats numbering at 445,175, and the Yakuts at 443,852. According to the 2002 census, there are 500,000 Tatars in Siberia, but 300,000 of them are Volga Tatars who settled in Siberia during periods of colonization. Other ethnic groups that live in the region and make a significant portion include ethnic Germans numbering about 400,000.

In 1875, Chambers reported the population of North Asia to be 8 million. Between 1801 and 1914, an estimated 7 million settlers moved from European Russia to Siberia, 85% during the quarter-century before World War I.

Largest cities or towns in North Asia 2010 Census
Rank		Region	Pop.
1	Novosibirsk	Siberia	1,633,595
2	Yekaterinburg	Ural (region)	1,544,376
3	Chelyabinsk	Ural (region)	1,189,525
4	Krasnoyarsk	Siberia	1,187,771
5	Omsk	Siberia	1,125,695
6	Tyumen	Ural (region)	847,488
7	Barnaul	Siberia	630,877
8	Khabarovsk	Russian Far East	617,441
9	Irkutsk	Siberia	617,264
10	Vladivostok	Russian Far East	603,519

== Administration ==
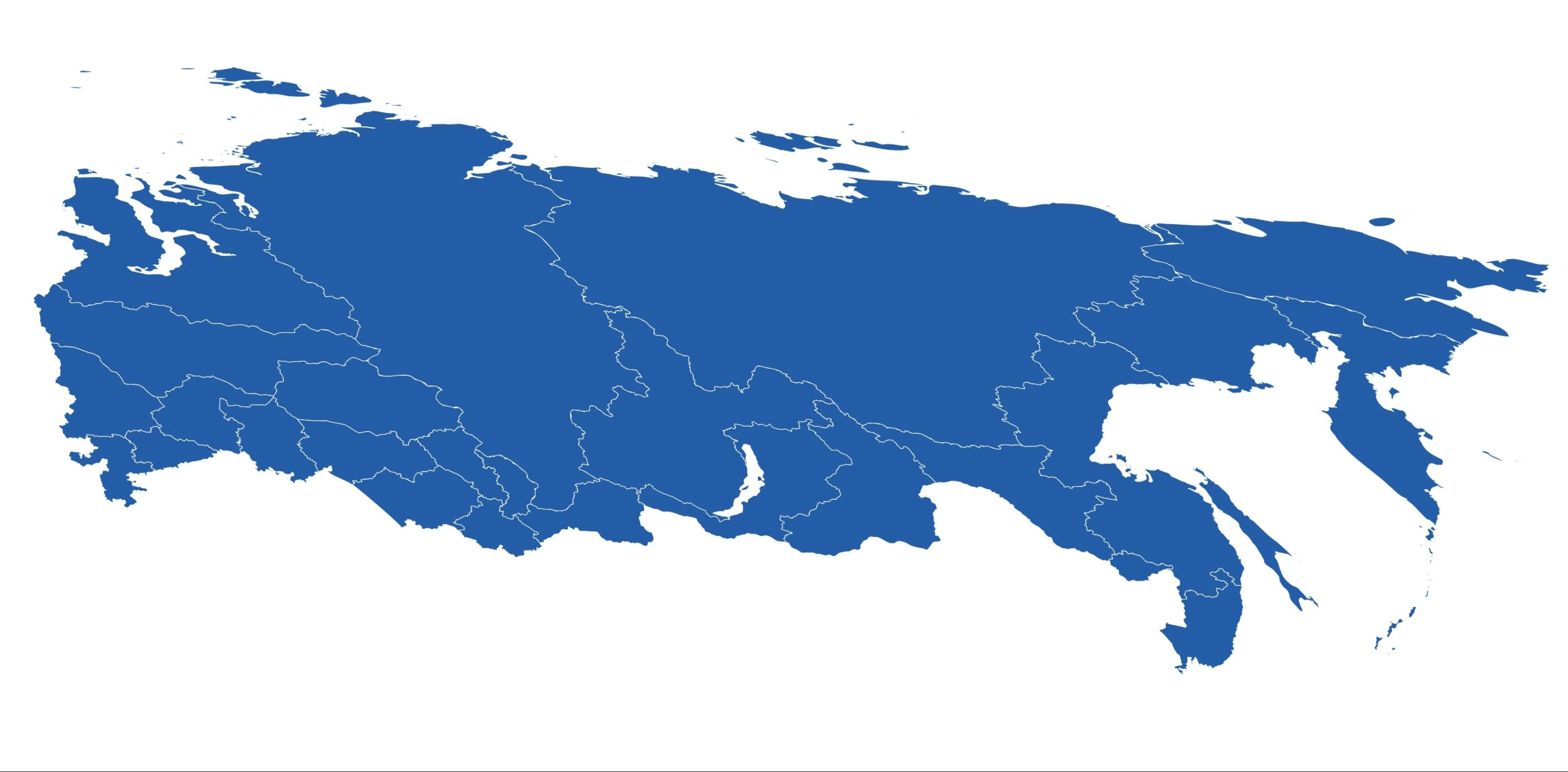
Subdivisions of Asian Russia (Siberia)

The area of North Asia is 13,132,900 km^{2} (5,070,641 sq mi) and the population in 2010 was 37,630,081.

Ural Federal District
Federal Subjects	Capital	Area (km^{2})	Population (2010)
Kurgan Oblast	Kurgan	71,000	910,807
Sverdlovsk Oblast	Yekaterinburg	194,800	4,297,747
Tyumen Oblast	Tyumen	143,520	3,395,755
Khanty-Mansi Autonomous Okrug (Yugra)	Khanty-Mansiysk	534,800	1,532,243
Chelyabinsk Oblast	Chelyabinsk	87,900	3,476,217
Yamalo-Nenets Autonomous Okrug	Salekhard	750,300	522,904
Total	Yekaterinburg	1,818,500	12,080,526

Siberian Federal District
Federal Subjects	Capital	Area (km^{2})	Population (2010)
Altai Republic	Gorno-Altaysk	92,900	206,168
Altai Krai	Barnaul	168,000	2,419,755
Irkutsk Oblast	Irkutsk	774,800	2,248,750
Kemerovo Oblast	Kemerovo	95,700	2,763,135
Krasnoyarsk Krai	Krasnoyarsk	2,366,800	2,828,187
Novosibirsk Oblast	Novosibirsk	177,800	2,665,911
Omsk Oblast	Omsk	141,100	1,977,665
Tomsk Oblast	Tomsk	314,400	1,047,394
Tuva Republic	Kyzyl	168,600	307,930
Republic of Khakassia	Abakan	61,600	532,403
Total	Novosibirsk	4,361,800	17,178,298

Far Eastern Federal District
Federal Subjects	Capital	Area (km^{2})	Population (2010)
Amur Oblast	Blagoveshchensk	361,900	830,103
Republic of Buryatia	Ulan-Ude	351,300	971,021
Jewish Autonomous Oblast	Birobidzhan	36,300	176,558
Zabaykalsky Krai	Chita	431,900	1,107,107
Kamchatka Krai	Petropavlovsk-Kamchatsky	464,300	322,079
Magadan Oblast	Magadan	462,500	156,996
Primorsky Krai	Vladivostok	164,700	1,956,497
Sakha Republic	Yakutsk	3,083,500	958,528
Sakhalin Oblast	Yuzhno-Sakhalinsk	87,100	497,973
Khabarovsk Krai	Khabarovsk	787,600	1,343,869
Chukotka Autonomous Okrug	Anadyr	721,500	50,526
Total	Vladivostok	6,952,600	8,371,257

== See also ==
- Arctic Region
- Far North
- European Russia
- Asia
- Geography of Asia
- Northeast Asia
- Russian Far East
- Ural region
- Siberian High, a semipermament anticyclone
