= Nu'tenut =

Chief god of Chukchi religion

The chief god of the Chukchi peoples. In Chukchi religious lore, Nu'tenut lived in a house built of iron. His retinue of attendants included the spirits of the earth, of light and darkness, of the sea, the sun, the moon and the sky.
