= Demographics of Siberia =

Geographically, Siberia includes the Russian Urals, Siberian, and Far Eastern Federal Districts. Between 2002 and 2015, the total population across the three Russian Federal Districts covering Siberia the Urals, Siberian and Far Eastern Federal Districts declined from 39.2 million to 37.8 million. During this period, the Urals Federal District decreased from 12.4 million to 12.3 million, the Siberian Federal District dropped from 20.1 million to 19.3 million, and the Far Eastern Federal District fell from 6.7 million to 6.2 million.

Siberia has population density of only three persons per square kilometer (comparable to Mongolia). The oblasts with the highest population densities are Chelyabinsk Oblast and Kemerovo Oblast, with 41 and 30 persons per square km, respectively.

== Population ==
- Urals Federal District, population ca. 12.08 million
  - Kurgan Oblast, population 1.02 million (2002)
  - Sverdlovsk Oblast, population 4.49 million (2002)
  - Tyumen Oblast, population 3.26 million (2002)
    - Khanty–Mansi Autonomous Okrug, population 1.5 million
    - Yamalo-Nenets Autonomous Okrug, population 550,000 inhabitants (2002)
  - Chelyabinsk Oblast, population 3.6 million (2002)
- Siberian Federal District, population 16,482,687.000 (2024)
  - Altai Krai, administrative center — Barnaul, population 2.6 million (2002)
  - Altai Republic, capital — Gorno-Altaisk, population 202,947 (2002)
  - Buryat Republic, capital — Ulan Ude, population 981,238 (2002)
  - Zabaykalsky Krai, administrative center — Chita, population 1,155,346 (2002)
  - Irkutsk Oblast, administrative center — Irkutsk, population 2.77 million (2002)
  - Republic of Khakassia, capital — Abakan, population 575,400.
  - Kemerovo Oblast, administrative center — Kemerovo, population 2.90 million (2002)
  - Krasnoyarsk Krai, administrative center — Krasnoyarsk, population 2.97 million (2002).
  - Novosibirsk Oblast, administrative center — Novosibirsk, population 2.69 million (2002)
  - Omsk Oblast, administrative center — Omsk, population 2.08 million (2002)
  - Tomsk Oblast, administrative center — Tomsk, population 1.06 million (2002)
  - Tuva Republic, capital — Kyzyl, population 305,510 (2002)
- Far Eastern Federal District (Russian Far East), population ca. 7.02 million
  - Sakha (Yakutia) Republic, capital — Yakutsk, population 949,280 (2002) — the only Far Eastern region that is sometimes counted as part of Siberia.

Excluding territories of north-central Kazakhstan, Siberia has a total population of ca. 38.7 million (2005). The North Kazakhstan oblast has another 1.1 million inhabitants (2002).

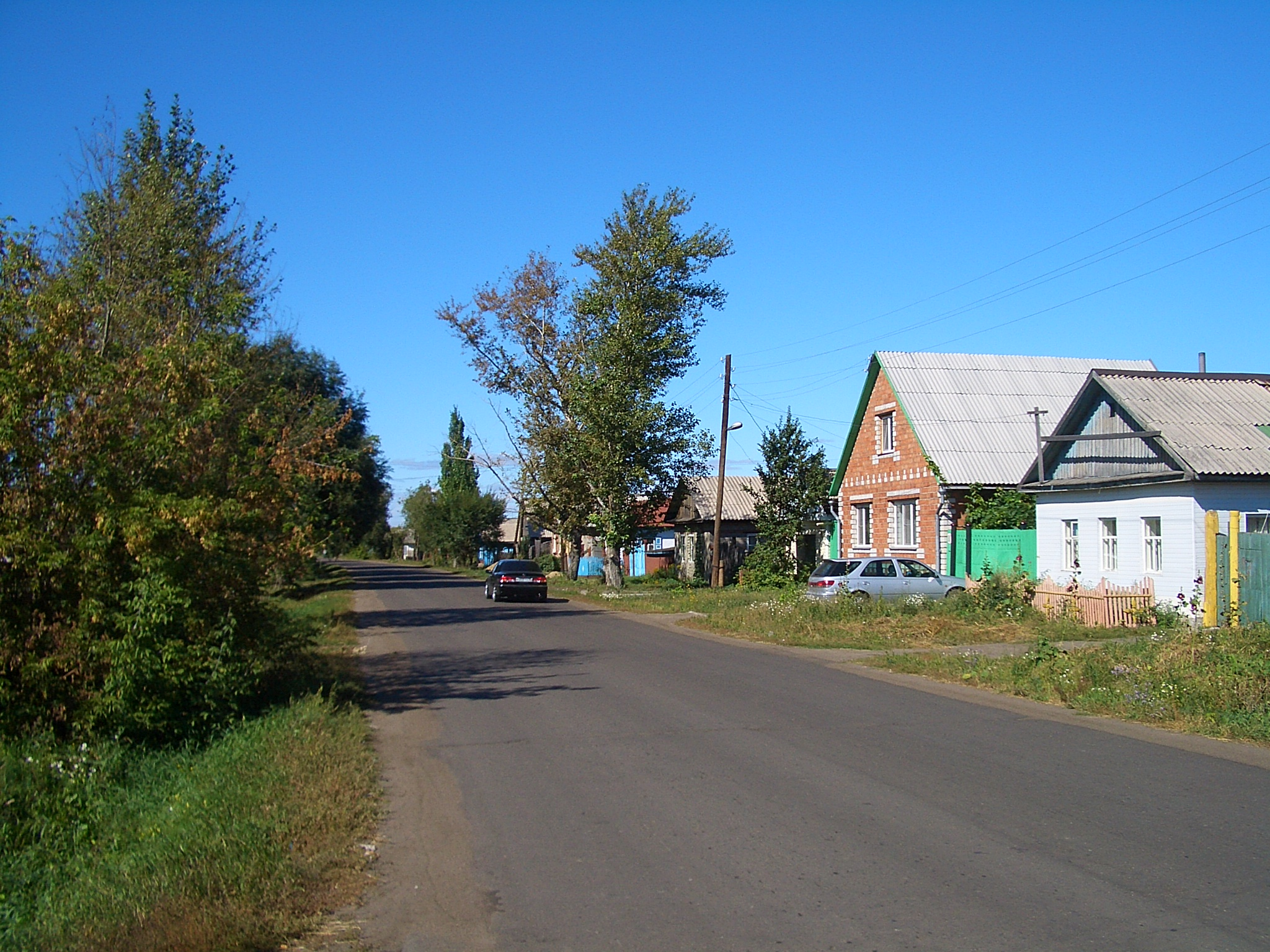
Cherlak, a typical small town - or a large village - in Western Siberia

About 70% of Siberia's people live in cities. Novosibirsk is the largest city in Siberia, with a population of about 1.5 million, followed by Yekaterinburg (1.3 million, Urals), Omsk (1.1 million), Chelyabinsk (1.07 million, in the Urals), Krasnoyarsk (0.91 million), Barnaul (0.60 million), Irkutsk (0.59 million), Kemerovo (0.52 million), Tyumen (0.51 million), Tomsk (0.48 million), Nizhny Tagil (0.39 million, Urals), Kurgan (0.36 million), Ulan Ude (0.36 million), Chita (0.32 million).

The above count, however, by including the entire Urals Federal District, includes cities not usually considered part of Siberia, i.e. Yekaterinburg, Chelyabinsk, and Nizhny Tagil.

== Ethnicities and languages ==
The vast majority of the Siberian population (over 85%) is Slavic and other Indo-European ethnicities, mainly the Russians (including their subethnic group Siberians), Ukrainians, and Germans. Most non-Slavic groups are Turkic. Smaller linguistic groups include Mongolic (ca. 600,000 speakers), Uralic (Samoyedic, Ugric; roughly 100,000 speakers), Manchu-Tungus (ca. 40,000 speakers), Chukotko-Kamchatkan (ca. 25,000 speakers), Eskimo–Aleut (some 2,000 speakers), Yukaghir (highly endangered), and languages isolates Ket (but see below) and Nivkh.

Mongolic, Turkic and Manchu-Tungus languages are sometimes taken together under the term Altaic. At one time Uralic and Altaic were believed to form the Ural–Altaic group, though this theory has now been largely discarded. The proposed Uralo-Siberian family combines the Uralic family with the Yukaghir languages, Chukotko-Kamchatkan, and Eskimo–Aleut. These are more umbrella terms than accepted linguistic relationships. The Yeniseian family, which includes Ket, has recently been linked with the Na-Dene languages into a Dené–Yeniseian group; while not universally accepted a broad consensus in favor of the proposal has emerged.

== See also ==
- Indigenous peoples of Siberia
- Paleosiberian languages
- Eurasiatic languages
- Demographics of Russia
- First All Union Census of the Soviet Union
