= Pon (deity) =

The Supreme Deity of the Yukaghir is called Pon, meaning "Something." Pon controlled all visible phenomena of nature such as the transition from day to night or the rain.
