= Western Mansi =

Extinct Uralic language

- маньсь льӓх, моаньсь лаатых
- Pronunciation: [manʲsʲ lʲæx], [moɒ̯nʲsʲ laːtəx]
- Native to: Russia
- Region: Sverdlovsk
- Extinct: late 20th century
- Language family: Uralic: Finno-Ugric?; Ugric?; Ob-Ugric?; Mansi; Core; Central; Western Mansi
- Dialects: Pelym; North Vagilsk; South Vagilsk; Lower Lozva; Middle Lozva; Vishera; ? Sosva; ? Tura

Language codes
- ISO 639-3: –
- Glottolog: west2976
- ELP: Western Mansi
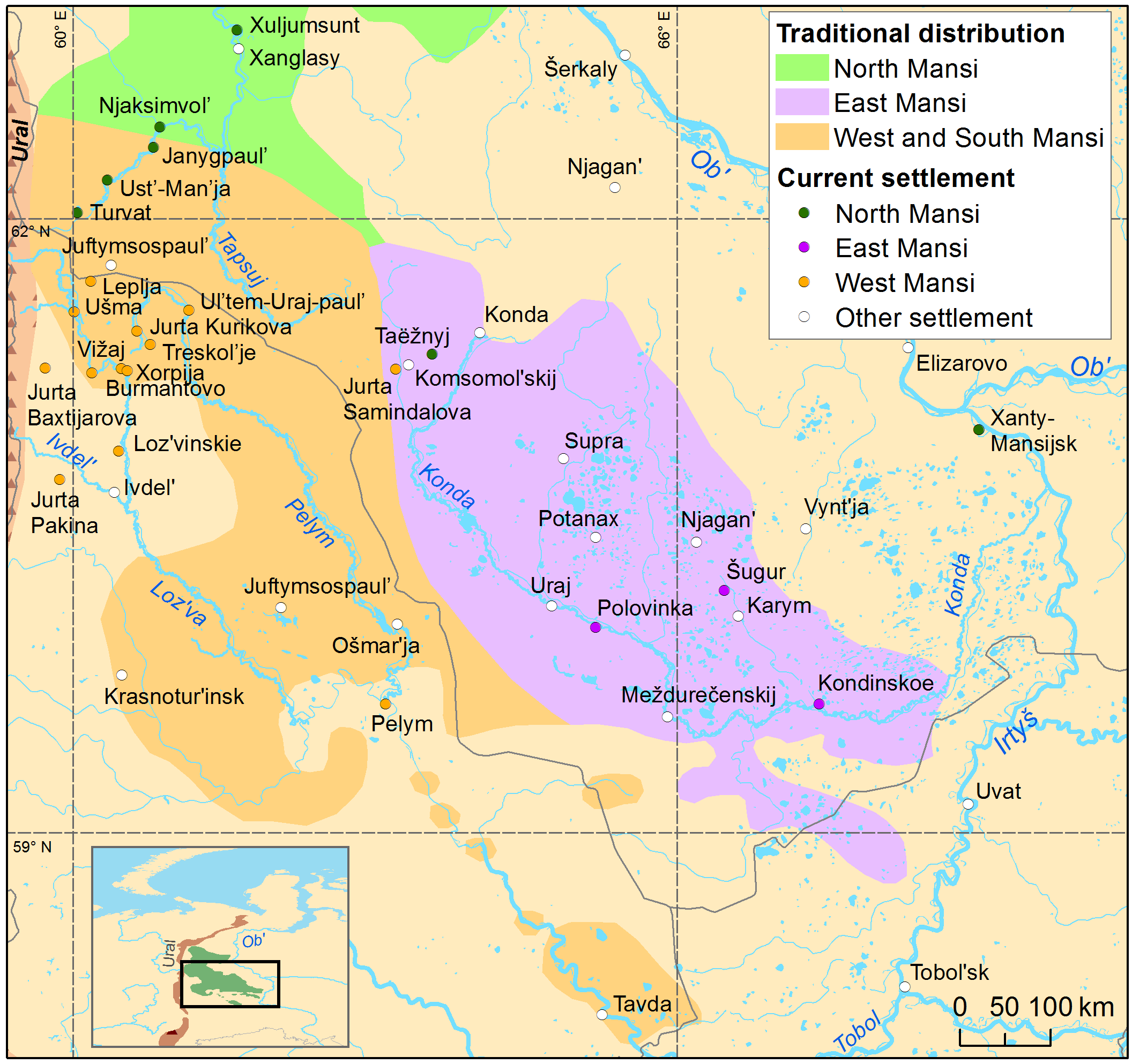
- Distribution ca. 1900 and current Mansi settlements

- Western Mansi is classified as Extinct by the UNESCO Atlas of the World's Languages in Danger (2010)

Western Mansi is an Uralic language that was described as "probably extinct" in 1988. Although the last speaker is not known, none existed by the end of the 20th century.

The language had strong Russian and Komi influences and considerable dialect differences.

== Varieties ==
Western Mansi was noted to be fractured in numerous divergent dialects, most of which were only poorly documented. The earliest linguistic descriptions were based on fieldwork by Antal Reguly in the 1840s and August Ahlqvist in the 1850s. Two varieties were studied by Bernát Munkácsi in 1888 to 1889 and eight varieties, divided in five dialects, were distinguished by Artturi Kannisto, who studied the Mansi from 1901 to 1906.

- The Pelym dialect is the best-known, studied by Ahlqvist, Munkácsi and Kannisto. Descriptions based on their materials have been given also by Honti and Eichinger.
- The Middle Lozva dialect was recorded by Reguly and Munkaćsi. By Kannisto's time, only one speaker remained.
- The Upper Lozva dialect, recorded by Kannisto.
- The North Vagilsk dialect, recorded by Kannisto, was at the time spoken in three villages, each with their own slight differences.
- The South Vagilsk dialect, recorded by Kannisto.

Several early wordlists were collected from multiple additional locations in the 18th century. These dialects' precise relationship to the better-known Western Mansi varieties remains unknown.

- Varieties west of the Urals were recorded along the Vishera (at Cherdyn and Ust-Uls) and near Solikamsk.
- Varieties east of the Urals further south are known from along the Southern Sosva and central Tura near Verkhoturye.
- A wordlist of unknown precise provenance was used by Strahlenberg.

== Phonology ==
Broad IPA transcription is given here, together with the usual Finno-Ugric Transcription used in most sources of Western Mansi.

=== Consonants ===
Western Mansi consonants
		Labial	Alveolar		(Alveolo-) palatal	Velar	
		Labial	plain	palatalized	(Alveolo-) palatal	plain	labialized
Nasals		/m/ m	/n/ n	/nʲ/ ń		/ŋ/ ŋ	†
Stops		/p/ p	/t/ t	/tʲ/ ť		/k/ k	/kʷ/ k°
Fricatives	voiceless		/s/ s	/sʲ/ ś	/ʃ/ š	/x/ χ	†
Fricatives	voiced	(β) β				/ɣ/ γ	
Semivowels					/j/ j		/w/ w
Laterals			/l/ l	/lʲ/ ľ			
Trill			/r/ r				

- /w/ could also be pronounced as [β].

†: [ŋʷ] and [xʷ] have been attested, but it is unclear if they were phonemic: they generally occur in labial vowel environment and show variation with [ŋ] and [x].

=== Vowels ===
Western Mansi vowels
	Front		Central	Back
	unrounded	rounded	Central	Back
Close	i i, iː ī	y ü, yː ǖ	ɨ i̮	u u, uː ū
Close-mid	e e, eː ē		ɘ e̮, ɘː ē̮	o o, oː ō
Open-mid	æ ä, æː ǟ			ɔ ɔ, ɔː ɔ̄ ^{ML}
Open	æ ä, æː ǟ			ɑ a, ɑː ā

(ML=Present only in Middle Lozva Mansi)

Long /iː/ arises mostly from earlier *iɣ or *ē adjacent to palatalized consonants. It was rare at Pelym, where these combinations remain, e.g. jiγ 'night', ēť 'evening', in other dialects jī, īť.

All varieties had at least one opening diphthong, continuing Proto-Mansi *ǟ, in most dialects back labial: Pelym and Middle Lozva [ɔɒ̯] (ɔå), South Vagilsk [oɒ̯] (oå), Lower Lozva [oɔ̯]. In North Vagilsk, this was front [yœ̯] (üɔ̈).

In Kannisto's records, short /æ/ was realized as open-mid [ɛ] or [ɜ] in the Pelym and Lower Lozva dialects; long /æː/ as Pelym [eɛ̯], Lower Lozva [ɛː].
