= Southern Khanty =

Uralic language

- хандэ Khande
- Native to: Russia (Khanty-Mansi Autonomous Okrug, Tyumen Oblast)
- Region: lower Irtysh
- Ethnicity: <1,000 southern Khanty
- Extinct: mid-20th century 56 (2010)
- Language family: Uralic: Khanty; Southern Khanty
- Dialects: Irtysh †; Demyansky †; Konda †; Ust-Nazym; Sogom †
- Writing system: unwritten

Language codes
- ISO 639-3: –
- Glottolog: sout3226 Southern Khanty
- ELP: Southern Khanty
- Map of where Southern Khanty was spoken

Southern Khanty is a Uralic language, frequently considered a dialect of a unified Khanty language, spoken by 56 people in 2010. It is considered to be extinct, its speakers having shifted starting in the 18th century to Russian or Siberian Tatar, but some speakers of the Kyshikov or Ust-Nazym dialect were found in its former territory. Speakers of Surgut Khanty have moved into the former territory of the Demyanka dialect. It was transitional between the Northern Khanty and Eastern Khanty dialect groups, but it is now a distinct language.

== Classification ==
Southern and Northern Khanty share various innovations and can be grouped together as Western Khanty. These include loss of full front rounded vowels: *üü, *öö, *ɔ̈ɔ̈ > *ii, *ee, *ää (but *ɔ̈ɔ̈ > *oo adjacent to *k, *ŋ), loss of vowel harmony, fricativization of *k to /x/ adjacent to back vowels, and the loss of the *ɣ phoneme.

== Dialects ==
Dialects of Southern Khanty:

- Upper Demjanka, Lower Demjanka, Konda, Cingali, Krasnojarsk

== See also ==
- Southern Mansi
