= Southern Mansi =

Extinct Uralic language

- Tavda Mansi
- mäńši~mäˈnči ľė̄χ~ľäχ~ľäŋ
- Pronunciation: [mæɲʃi~mæ̍nt͡ʃi ľėːχ~lʲæχ~lʲæŋ]
- Native to: Russia
- Region: Sverdlovsk Oblast
- Extinct: 1960s
- Language family: Uralic: Finno-Ugric?; Ugric?; Ob-Ugric?; Mansi; Southern Mansi
- Dialects: Tavda; Tagil; Tura; Chusovaya (all extinct)

Language codes
- ISO 639-3: –
- Glottolog: sout3253
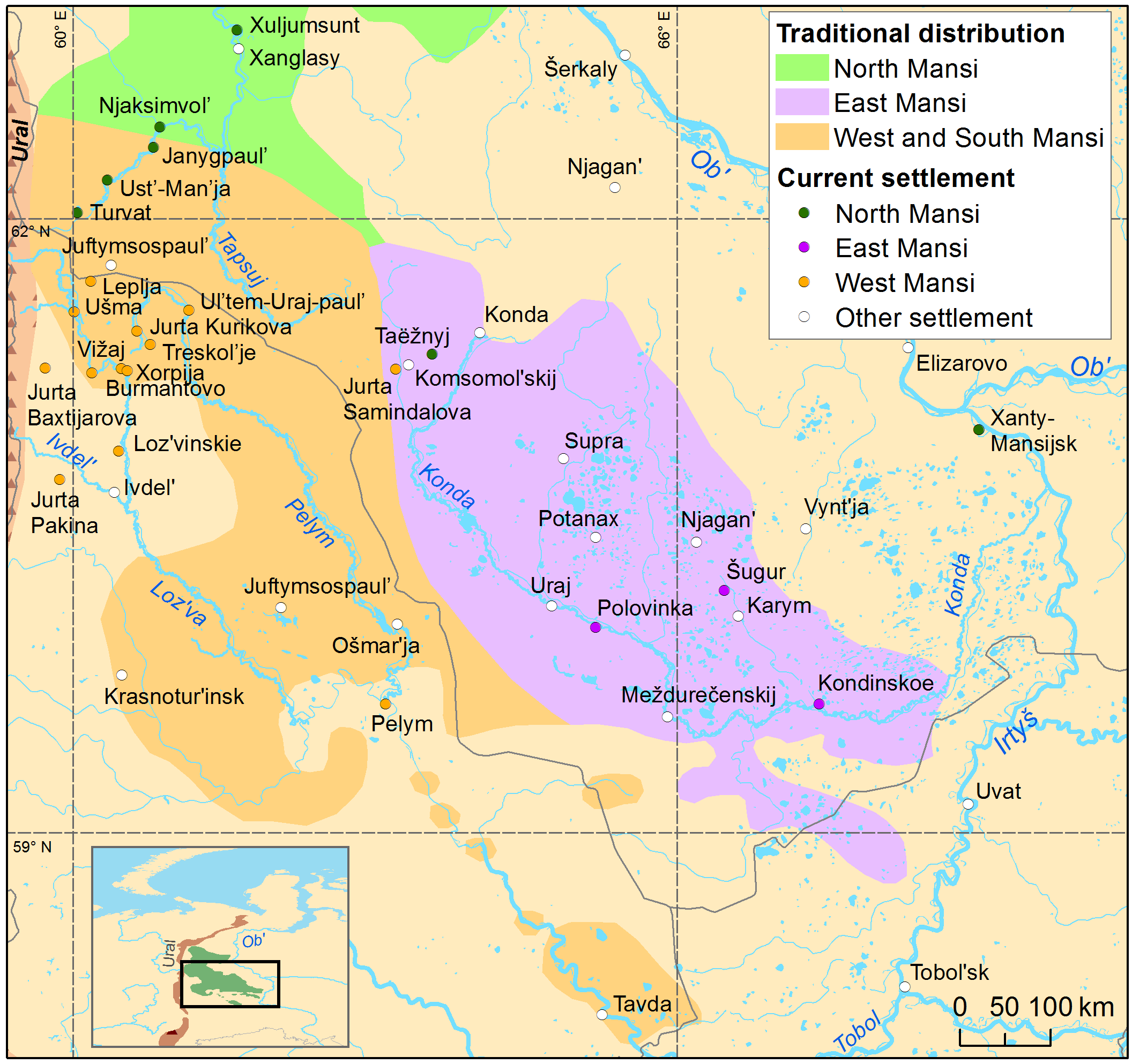
- Traditional distribution and current Mansi settlements

- Southern Mansi is classified as Extinct by the UNESCO Atlas of the World's Languages in Danger (2010)

Southern or Tavda Mansi is an extinct Uralic language spoken in Russia in the Sverdlovsk Oblast. Its main records come from an area isolated from the other Mansi varieties along the river Tavda. Around 1900, about 200 speakers existed, but in the 1960s, it was spoken only by a few elderly speakers. It has since then become extinct. It had strong Tatar lexical influence and displayed several archaisms such as vowel harmony, retention of /æː/ (elsewhere backed to /aː/ or diphthongized), /ɑː/ (elsewhere raised to /oː/) and /tsʲ/ (elsewhere deaffricated to /sʲ/).

Russian researchers use the term "southern dialect" (Russian: южный диалект) to describe the Tavda language.

== Varieties and documentation ==
Southern Mansi was formerly spoken along a range to both the west and east of the Ural Mountains. Wordlists of Southern Mansi have been recorded across this area in the 18th century from the towns of Kungur, Verkhnyaya Tura and Verkhoturye and from settlements along the Chusovaya River and Tagil River. Only the Tavda dialect was met and recorded (from three villages: Janychkova, Chandyri and Gorodok) on the expeditions of the Hungarian linguist Bernát Munkácsi in 1888–1889 and the Finnish linguist Artturi Kannisto in 1901–1906. During 1960s expeditions by Hungarian linguists, it, too, was found to be moribund, and is presumed to have become extinct shortly afterwards.

== Sample text ==
1904 conversation by Artturi Kannisto
Tavda Chandryi Mansi	English
ɔɔls jükänäät äńćüx, ääwään ɔɔls.	There was a woman and a man, they had a daughter.
komnɔɔ mińääs ääwään.	Their daughter got married.
ämäänmi, länt, täärtiin tääńťəm pɔwlən!	Let me go, —she says, — to the village of the well-fed!
tääńťəm pɔwlənt ńokor ɔɔl?	What is in the village of the well-fed?
kɔnšɔɔŋ kärääľk ɔɔl.	(There) is a colourfully plaited loaf.
kɔnšɔɔŋ kärääľkän kɔɔt ɔɔl?	Where is the colourfully plaited loaf?
kɔnšɔɔŋ äämpnää jüütäjüüs.	A colourful dog ate it.
kɔnšɔɔŋ äämpən kɔɔt ɔɔl?	Where is the colourful dog?
wɔɔrpɛŋn noŋšɔŋgʰɔɔs.	It jumped up on the top of a spruce tree.
wɔɔrpɛŋgʰən kɔɔt ɔɔl?	Where is the top of a spruce?
täütnää iltäjüüs.	The fire ate (burned) it.
täütən kɔɔt ɔɔl?	Where is the fire?
üťnää ilkɔrootoos.	Water extinguished it.
üťən kɔɔt ɔɔl	Where is the water?
kiť pokɔɔn üšɔpkojoos.	Two bulls drank it.
Jiinićkänäät Piľkään jäktiim jüütäjüüs.	Inichke and Pilke have slaughtered them and ate them.
Jiinićkänäät Piľkään kɔɔt ɔɔl?	Where are Inichke and Pilke?
Jiinićkäm jɔlkajl jɔŋgʰɔɔs jɔ Piľkääm noŋgʰail jɔŋgʰɔɔs.	Inichke turned downstream (the river), and Pilke turned upstream.

== Sources ==
- Honti, László (1975). Das System der paradigmatischen Suffixmorpheme des wogulischen Dialektes an der Tavda.
- Ромбандеева, Е. И. (1976). "Мансийский язык". Основы финно-угорского языкознания. Марийский, пермский и угорские языки (in Russian). Москва: Наука. pp. 229–239.
