= Alternative theories of Hungarian language origins =

Hungarian is categorised as a member of the Uralic language family. Nevertheless, there are a large number of fringe theories about the origin of the Hungarian language that depart from the mainstream scientific consensus, as well as ideas of historical interest.

== Alternative theories ==
=== The Ugric–Turkic War ===
Ármin Vámbéry was a Hungarian traveler and Turkologist. He was the first to put forward a significant alternative origin theory. He considered Hungarian a mixed language, having not just one but two (Finno-Ugric and Turkic) genetic ancestors. Vámbéry's first large linguistic work, entitled "Magyar és török-tatár nyelvekbeli szóegyezések" and published in 1869–70, was the casus belli of the "Ugric-Turkic War" (Hungarian: Ugor-török háború), which started as a scientific dispute, but quickly turned into a bitter feud lasting for two decades. In this work, Vámbéry tried to demonstrate, with the help of word comparisons, that as a result of the intermingling of the early Hungarians with Turkic peoples, the Hungarian language gained a distinct dual character as Ugric and Turkic albeit it is Ugric in origin, so he presented a variant of linguistic contact theory.

Vámbéry's work was criticized by Finno-Ugrist József Budenz in "Jelentés Vámbéry Ármin magyar-török szóegyezéséről", published in 1871. Budenz criticised Vámbéry and his work in an aggressive, derogatory style, and questioned Vámbéry's (scientific) honesty and credibility. The historian Henrik Marczali, linguist Károly Pozder, linguist József Thúry, anthropologist Aurél Török, and many other scientists supported Vámbéry.

In his work titled "Vámbéry Ármin: A magyarok eredete. Ethnologiai tanulmány.", and published in 1882, Vámbéry went a step further, and presented a newer version of his theory, in which he claimed that the Hungarian nation and language are Turkic in origin, and the Finno-Ugric element in them is a result of later contact and intermingling.

"...I see a compound people in Hungarians, in which not the Finno-Ugric, but the Turkic-Tatar component gives the true core..."

"...a magyarban vegyülék népet látok, a melyben nem finn-ugor, hanem török-tatár elem képezi a tulajdonképeni magvat..." in: Vámbéry Ármin: A magyarok eredete. Ethnologiai tanulmány. Preface. p. VI.

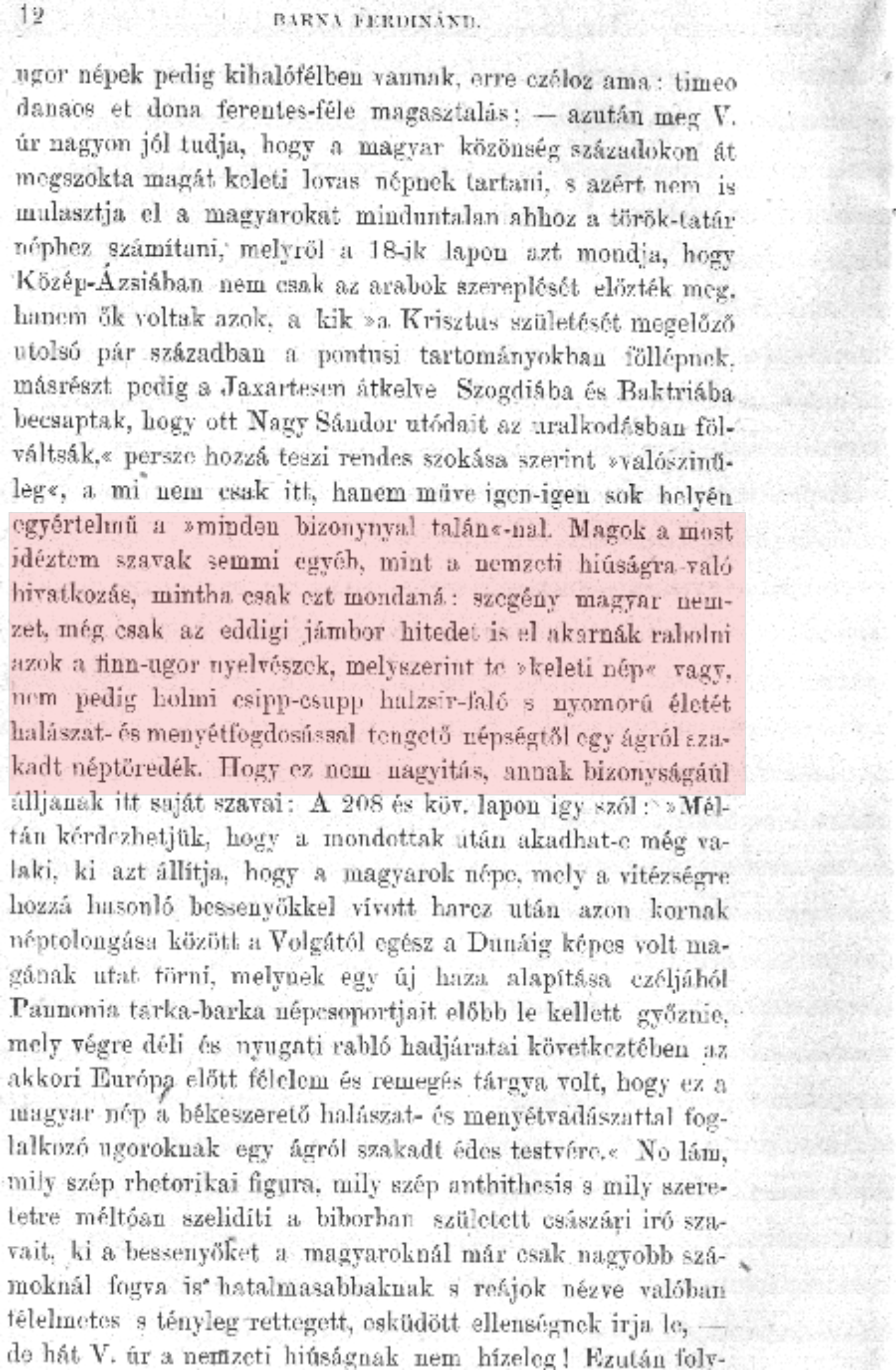
The origin of 'fish fat smelling kinship' in the work of the Finno-Ugrist Barna Ferdinánd, titled "Vámbéry Ármin A magyarok eredete czímű műve néhány főbb állításának bírálata." published in 1884.

=== Kabardian-Hungarian ===
Linguist Gábor Bálint de Szentkatolna was the first to systematize and represent the theory of a Kabardian-Hungarian language group. While on his travels to the Caucasus, Szentkatolna noticed that Hungarian appeared to be related to Kabardian. In his book A honfoglalás revíziója ("Revision of the Conquest"), the linguist tries to prove the relation not only from the lingual side but from historical and cultural aspects as well. According to his theory, the Huns did not fully merge with the other nomadic people migrating to Europe, with some of them staying in the Caucasus region, and others returning to the Carpathian Basin. According to his theories, the Huns had two descendants, the Khazars and the Avars. He did not consider the Kabardians—who live in the Caucasus—aboriginals, rather he considered them the direct descendants of the Khazars. He classified both languages as part of the Turanian language family (which is roughly the same as the Uralic-Altaic language family theory today), but considered them unique languages, that did not belong to the Turk language group. He did not exclude the Ugric impact, as he thought that the tribe of the Sabir people who joined Hungarians—mentioned by Purple-born Constantine (szabartoiaszfaloi)—is such a tribe. The most major error in his theory is that he handled Kabardian as a fully isolated language, claiming that it changed very little, ignoring the local linguistic evolution. His work was forgotten after the language war, and the theory was never debated. The last person who engaged with the theory was Pál Sándor in 1903. Sándor issued his writings with the title Magyar és a kabard nyelv viszonya ("Hungarian and Kabardian languages' relation").

=== Yeniseian ===
Based on lexical similarities between Hungarian and the Yeniseian languages, it has been argued by Jingyi Gao that the Hungarian language has a Hunnic substratum. The Hunnic language has been theorized to be of Yeniseian origin by some linguists being closely related to Pumpokol and Arin. This theory was picked up by Jingyi Gao who argued that lexical evidence shows that Hungarian has multiple loanwords from a supposedly Yeniseian Hunnic language. The following correspondences have been proposed:

Similar vocabulary
Hungarian	Ket	Yugh	Pumpokol	Arin	Proto-Yeniseian
hegy [hɛɟ] 'mountain'	qaˀj 'mountain'	xaˀj	kónnoŋ (plural form)		*qaˀj
ég 'sky'	es 'sky'	es	eč	eš	*es
hó 'snow'	qo 'ice'	xo			*qoga
apa 'father'	oop 'father'	op	ab	ɨpä	*ob(ǝ)
hús 'meat'	iis 'meat'	iis	híte	iži	
út 'road'	qɔˀt 'road'	χɔˀt	koat	kut	*qɔˀt
tenger 'sea'	tɨŋǝĺ	tɨŋɨlsi	tokardu		*tʰɨŋ(g)ǝl
só 'salt'	tʌˀ 'salt'	čʌˀ	če		t*’ǝgǝ”
has 'belly'	hɨj 'belly'				
szel- 'cut'	saˀl 'cutting edge'	saˀr 'cutting edge'			

=== Hungarian-Sumerian hypothesis ===
A hypothesis exists in Hungarian and international historiography that relates the Sumerians to the Hungarians. According to it, the Sumerian and Hungarian languages would be related and the ancestors of both peoples would have had contact in the past and share a common origin. This leaves a huge temporal gap and suggests a very extensive origin for the speakers of Uralic languages (as their Urheimat is generally believed to be at the west of the Ural Mountains). Most of its supporters deny a direct linguistic relationship between Hungarian and the other Finno-Ugric languages.

The hypothesis had more popularity among Sumerologists in the 19th and early 20th centuries. Nowadays, it is mostly dismissed, although it is acknowledged that Sumerian is an agglutinative language, like the Hungarian, Turkish and Finnish languages and regarding linguistic structure resembles these and some Caucasian languages; however, in vocabulary, grammar, and syntax Sumerian still stands alone and seems to be unrelated to any other language, living or dead.

=== Etruscan-Hungarian ===
Another theory that received attention was the Etruscan-Hungarian theory, based on the research of Italian linguist Mario Alinei. Rather than speaking about an Etruscan-Hungarian language relation, Alinei claims that Etruscan belongs to the Aryan family, and concludes that its closest relative is Hungarian. Alinei's proposal has been rejected by Etruscan experts such as Giulio M. Facchetti, and Hungarian historical linguists such as Bela Brogyanyi.

=== Hungarian root theory ===
The root theory is a system of internal reconstruction of Hungarian and proposes an analysis similar to the triconsonantal roots found in the Semitic languages but based mainly on pairs of two consonants.

The system was first proposed by Gergely Czuczor and János Fogarasi in their six-volume dictionary of Hungarian, published between 1861 and 1874. The integrated word bush system runs through the language organically. Later supporters of the root theory claim that official Hungarian linguistics denies this simple fact, ignores the method of inner reconstruction and ignores the Czuczor-Fogarasi dictionary. The methodology, however, is considered unscientific by a wide range of academics.

The fragments of these bush systems are further alleged to be found also in other languages in part or ruins, but none of them as whole as in Hungarian. Loan words, taken from other languages either took root and were pulled into the same meaning-circle as the corresponding root, were only used in a specific field or were spilled out from the language. These bush systems—as the result of loaning larger amounts of words, and the fading meaning of the word roots, are broken in the majority of the languages. Because of the logical buildup of the word bushes (self-similarity, natural forms), the Hungarian language either developed together with an artificial language, or–respecting the iconic pictures, hiding in the roots–it developed as the human mind advanced. According to this theory, the clearest form of ancient language was preserved in the language that we call Hungarian today. They assume that ancient Hungarians were the transmitters, rather than the receivers, of this knowledge and its words, or they least adopted it extremely successfully. Therefore, this theory requires proto-Hungarians to have lived in and around the Carpathian Basin longer than is normally accepted.

The root theory has almost since its introduction been criticized for its incompatibility with most other research on Hungarian etymology, particularly with loanword studies, in proposing root etymologies even for relatively recent loanwords acquired from the Slavic, Romance and Germanic languages.

Critics of the root theory point out that the theory is not scientifically provable. Critics claim that the root system is not a special, new, or newly founded linguistic attribute, but a "linguistic constant", which can be found in almost every language. Continuing, critics point out that it is impossible to not exclude the possibility of the import of the root system, because the Hungarian language does have root composing trends but in an even more ancient form.

== See also ==
- Cal-Ugrian theory
