= Voiced retroflex nasal =

Consonantal sound represented by ⟨ɳ⟩ in IPA

ɳ
- IPA number: 117

Audio sample
- source · help

Encoding
- Entity (decimal): &#627;
- Unicode (hex): U+0273
- X-SAMPA: n`
- Braille: ⠲ (braille pattern dots-256) ⠝ (braille pattern dots-1345)
Image

A voiced retroflex nasal is a type of consonantal sound, used in some spoken languages. The symbol in the International Phonetic Alphabet that represents this sound is ⟨ɳ⟩.

Like all the retroflex consonants, the IPA symbol is formed by adding a rightward-pointing hook (right-tail) extending from the bottom of ⟨n⟩, the letter used for the corresponding alveolar consonant. It is similar to ⟨ɲ⟩, the letter for the palatal nasal, which has a leftward-pointing hook (left-tail) extending from the bottom of the left stem, and to ⟨ŋ⟩, the letter for the velar nasal, which has a leftward-pointing hook extending from the bottom of the right stem.

== Features ==
Sagittal section of a voiced retroflex nasal

Features of a voiced retroflex nasal:

- Its manner of articulation is occlusive, which means it is produced by obstructing airflow in the vocal tract. Because the consonant is also nasal, the blocked airflow is redirected through the nose.
- Its place of articulation is retroflex, which prototypically means it is articulated subapical (with the tip of the tongue curled up), but more generally, it means that it is postalveolar without being palatalized. That is, besides the prototypical subapical articulation, the tongue can be apical (pointed) or, in some fricatives, laminal (flat).
- Its phonation is voiced, which means the vocal cords vibrate during the articulation.
- It is a nasal consonant, which means air is exclusively allowed to escape through the nose for nasal stops; otherwise, in addition to through the mouth.
- It is a median consonant, which means it is produced by directing the airstream down the midline of the tongue, rather than to the sides.
- Its airstream mechanism is pulmonic, which means it is articulated by pushing air only with the intercostal muscles and abdominal muscles, as in most speech sounds.

== Occurrence ==
Language		Word	IPA	Meaning	Notes
Bengali					Rare; occurs in the extreme western dialects
Enindhilyagwa		yingarna	[jiŋaɳa]	'snake'	
Faroese		ørn	[œɻɳ]	'eagle'	
Hindi		ठण्डा/ṭhaṇḍā	[ʈʰəɳɖaː]	'cold'	
Kannada		ಅಣೆ/aṇe	[ɐɳe]	'dam'	
Khanty	Eastern	eṇə	[eɳə]	'large'	Present since Proto-Khanty. Merges with /n/ in Southern Khanty and in some subdialects of Eastern (e.g. Jugan, Pim) and Northern (e.g. Nizyam, Sherkaly, Obdorsk).
Khanty	Northern	eṇə	[eɳə]	'large'	Present since Proto-Khanty. Merges with /n/ in Southern Khanty and in some subdialects of Eastern (e.g. Jugan, Pim) and Northern (e.g. Nizyam, Sherkaly, Obdorsk).
Malayalam		അണ/aṇa	[ɐɳɐ]	'jaw'	
Marathi		बाण/bāṇa	[baːɳ]	'arrow'	Often realized as a flap in intervocalic and word-final positions. See Marathi phonology
Nepali		अण्डा/aṇḍā	[ʌɳɖä]	'egg'	See Nepali phonology
Norwegian		garn	[ɡɑːɳ]	'yarn'	See Norwegian phonology
Odia		ବଣି/baṇi	[bɔɳi]	'myna bird'	
Pashto		اتڼ/Ataṇ	[at̪aɳ]	'Attan'	
Punjabi		ਪੁਰਾਣ/purāṇ	[pʊraːɳ]	'Purana'	
Scottish Gaelic	Lewis	iutharn	[ˈjʊhʊɳ]	'hell'	Dialectal realisation of /rˠn̪ˠ/.
Sinhala		ණය / ṇaya	[ɳajə]	'debt'	Rare, typically only in words with the letter ⟨ණ⟩. See Sinhala phonology
Swedish	Central Standard	garn	[ɡɑːɳ]	'yarn'	See Swedish phonology
Tamil		ஆண்/āṇ	[aːɳ]	'male'	See Tamil phonology
Telugu		గొణుగు/goṇugu	[goɳugu]	'murmur'	Occurs as allophone of anuswara when followed by Voiced retroflex plosives.
Vietnamese		anh trả	[aɳ˧ ʈa˨˩˦]	'you pay'	Allophone of /n/ before /ʈ/ in Saigon dialect. See Vietnamese phonology

== See also ==
- Index of phonetics articles

== Notes ==
Place →	Labial					Coronal										Dorsal					Laryngeal			
Manner ↓	Bilabial		Labiodental		Linguolabial		Dental		Alveolar		Postalveolar		Retroflex		(Alveolo-)palatal		Velar		Uvular		Pharyngeal/epiglottal		Glottal	
Nasal	m̥	m	ɱ̊	ɱ		n̼	n̪̊	n̪	n̥	n	n̠̊	n̠	ɳ̊	ɳ	ɲ̊	ɲ	ŋ̊	ŋ	ɴ̥	ɴ				
Plosive	p	b	p̪	b̪	t̼	d̼	t̪	d̪	t	d			ʈ	ɖ	c	ɟ	k	ɡ	q	ɢ	ʡ		ʔ	
Sibilant affricate							t̪s̪	d̪z̪	ts	dz	t̠ʃ	d̠ʒ	tʂ	dʐ	tɕ	dʑ								
Non-sibilant affricate	pɸ	bβ	p̪f	b̪v			t̪θ	d̪ð	tɹ̝̊	dɹ̝	t̠ɹ̠̊˔	d̠ɹ̠˔			cç	ɟʝ	kx	ɡɣ	qχ	ɢʁ	ʡʜ	ʡʢ	ʔh	
Sibilant fricative							s̪	z̪	s	z	ʃ	ʒ	ʂ	ʐ	ɕ	ʑ								
Non-sibilant fricative	ɸ	β	f	v	θ̼	ð̼	θ	ð	θ̠	ð̠	ɹ̠̊˔	ɹ̠˔	ɻ̊˔	ɻ˔	ç	ʝ	x	ɣ	χ	ʁ	ħ	ʕ	h	ɦ
Approximant		β̞		ʋ				ð̞		ɹ		ɹ̠		ɻ		j		ɰ						˷
Tap/flap		ⱱ̟		ⱱ					ɾ̥	ɾ			ɽ̊	ɽ						ɢ̆		ʡ̆		
Trill	ʙ̥	ʙ							r̥	r		r̠	ɽ̊r̥	ɽr					ʀ̥	ʀ	ʜ	ʢ		
Lateral affricate									tɬ	dɮ			tꞎ	d𝼅	c𝼆	ɟʎ̝	k𝼄	ɡʟ̝						
Lateral fricative							ɬ̪		ɬ	ɮ			ꞎ	𝼅	𝼆	ʎ̝	𝼄	ʟ̝						
Lateral approximant								l̪	l̥	l		l̠	ɭ̊	ɭ	ʎ̥	ʎ	ʟ̥	ʟ		ʟ̠				
Lateral tap/flap									ɺ̥	ɺ			𝼈̊	𝼈		ʎ̆		ʟ̆						

		BL	LD	D	A	PA	RF	P	V	U
Implosive	Voiced	ɓ			ɗ		ᶑ	ʄ	ɠ	ʛ
Implosive	Voiceless	ɓ̥			ɗ̥		ᶑ̊	ʄ̊	ɠ̊	ʛ̥
Ejective	Stop	pʼ			tʼ		ʈʼ	cʼ	kʼ	qʼ
Ejective	Affricate		p̪fʼ	t̪θʼ	tsʼ	t̠ʃʼ	tʂʼ	tɕʼ	kxʼ	qχʼ
Ejective	Fricative	ɸʼ	fʼ	θʼ	sʼ	ʃʼ	ʂʼ	ɕʼ	xʼ	χʼ
Ejective	Lateral affricate				tɬʼ			c𝼆ʼ	k𝼄ʼ	q𝼄ʼ
Ejective	Lateral fricative				ɬʼ					
Click (top: velar; bottom: uvular)	Tenuis	kʘ qʘ		kǀ qǀ	kǃ qǃ		k𝼊 q𝼊	kǂ qǂ		
Click (top: velar; bottom: uvular)	Voiced	ɡʘ ɢʘ		ɡǀ ɢǀ	ɡǃ ɢǃ		ɡ𝼊 ɢ𝼊	ɡǂ ɢǂ		
Click (top: velar; bottom: uvular)	Nasal	ŋʘ ɴʘ		ŋǀ ɴǀ	ŋǃ ɴǃ		ŋ𝼊 ɴ𝼊	ŋǂ ɴǂ	ʞ	
Click (top: velar; bottom: uvular)	Tenuis lateral				kǁ qǁ					
Click (top: velar; bottom: uvular)	Voiced lateral				ɡǁ ɢǁ					
Click (top: velar; bottom: uvular)	Nasal lateral				ŋǁ ɴǁ					
