= Eugene Helimski =

Russian linguist (1950–2007)

- Евге́ний Арно́льдович Хели́мский
- Born: 15 March 1950; Odessa, Soviet Union
- Died: 25 December 2007 (aged 57); Hamburg, Germany

Eugene Arnoldovich Helimski (also spelled Eugene Khelimski; Russian: Евге́ний Арно́льдович Хели́мский Evgeniy Arnol'dovich Khelimsky; 15 March 1950 – 25 December 2007) was a Soviet and Russian linguist, who spent his later years working in Germany. He held a Doctor of Philology degree (1988) and was a professor.

Helimski specialized in Samoyedic and Finno-Ugric languages, explored questions of Uralic and Nostratic linguistic relationships, language contact, the theory of genetic language classification, as well as the cultural history of Northern Eurasia and shamanism. He became one of the world’s leading authorities on the Samoyedic languages.

== Biography ==
Helimski graduated in 1972 from the Department of Structural and Applied Linguistics at Moscow State University. He defended his Candidate Dissertation, Ancient Ugro-Samoyedic Linguistic Ties (Tartu, 1979), and his Doctoral Dissertation, Historical and Descriptive Dialectology of the Samoyedic Languages (Tartu, 1988).

From 1978 to 1997, he worked at the Institute of Slavic and Balkan Studies of the Russian Academy of Sciences. He also taught at the RSUH (1992–1998), at the University of Budapest (1994–1995), and lectured at several other European universities. Beginning in 1998, he served as Professor at the University of Hamburg and Director of its Institute of Finno-Ugric/Uralic Studies.

== Scientific contributions ==
Helimski organized and took part in numerous linguistic expeditions to Siberia and the Taimyr Peninsula. He conducted fieldwork on all of the Samoyedic languages and co-authored the well-known Studies on the Selkup language, which significantly expanded scholarly understanding of the Samoyedic branch.

He identified regular patterns in the historical phonetics of Hungarian and demonstrated grammatical and lexical parallels between Ugric and Samoyedic. He compiled all available data on Mator, an extinct South Samoyedic language, and published its dictionary and grammar. Helimski also proposed new Uralic, Indo-European, and Nostratic etymologies, and collected extensive material on loanwords in Siberian languages (including Russian).

In his 1988 paper, Helimski introduced the concept of the Pannonian Slavic language (spoken by Pannonian Slavs in the Early Middle Ages) as a distinct, widespread language entity (or koine) later absorbed by Hungarian as a substratum. His reconstruction of early Slavic loanwords helped pivot the modern consensus toward viewing Pannonian Slavic as an idiom with strong Czech, Slovak and Slovene lexical affinities.

In comparative linguistics, he introduced modifications to the traditional "genealogical tree" model based on Uralic evidence, influencing broader approaches to language classification.

Helimski also studied shamanism among the Samoyedic peoples, collecting and publishing texts of shamanic incantations.

He edited several volumes of Таймырский этнолингвистический сборник (Taimyr Ethno-Linguistic Compendium, RSUH) and other works on Uralistics.

He initiated the creation of a digital Uralic database, which later became part of Sergei Starostin's StarLing Project. (This database was largely based on Károly Rédei’s Uralic Etymological Dictionary [UEW].)

== Selected works ==
- Очерки по селькупскому языку: Тазовский диалект [Studies on the Selkup Language: Taz Dialect], vols. 1–3. Moscow, 1980, 1993, 2002. (Co-authored with A. I. Kuznetsova et al.)
- Древнейшие венгерско-самодийские языковые параллели: Лингвистическая и этногенетическая интерпретация [The Earliest Hungarian–Samoyedic Parallels: Linguistic and Ethnogenetic Interpretation]. Moscow, 1982.
- The Language of the First Selkup Books. Szeged, 1983. (Studia Uralo-Altaica 22).
- Die Matorische Sprache: Wörterbuch – Grundzüge der Grammatik – Sprachgeschichte [The Mator Language: Dictionary, Grammar Outline, and Language History]. With contributions by Beáta Nagy. Szeged, 1997. (Studia Uralo-Altaica 41).
- Компаративистика, уралистика: Лекции и статьи [Comparative Studies and Uralistics: Lectures and Articles]. Moscow, 2000.
- Самодийско-тунгусо-маньчжурские лексические связи [Samoyedic–Tungusic–Manchu Lexical Relations]. Moscow: Languages of Slavic Culture, 2007. (Co-author: A. E. Anikin).
