= Otto von Sadovszky =

Hungarian-American anthropologist

Otto J. von Sadovszky
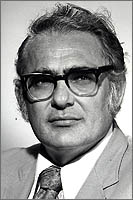
- Born: Otto Joseph von Sadovszky; July 3, 1925; Hungary
- Died: May 12, 2004 (aged 78); Orange, California
- Other name: Otto Joseph Rudolf Irene von Sadovszky
- Education: UC Berkeley, UCLA
- Occupations: professor, anthropologist
- Years active: 1971-1994
- Employer: Cal State Fullerton
- Known for: Cal-Ugrian theory
- Notable work: The discovery of California: a Cal-Ugrian comparative study

Otto J. von Sadovszky (July 3, 1925 – May 12, 2004) was a Hungarian-American anthropologist who worked at California State University, Fullerton in southern California for most of his career until his retirement. He is best known for his linguistic work attempting to link Native American languages of California to languages spoken in Siberia.

== Personal life and education ==
Sadovszky was born in Hungary on July 3, 1925 and grew to maturity there during World War II. He and his wife Maria raised two children.

Sadovszky received his Ph.L. at Collegium Aloysianum.

After leaving Europe for the United States to study Sanskrit at UC Berkeley he met a graduate student in linguistics who was studying Miwok, and Sadovszky found that he could understand many of the terms from Miwok, a language of the Penutian group, despite having no training in it, due to the familiarity of many of the terms to Uralic languages from central Siberia he had studied earlier in Europe which were related to his native Hungarian. Sadovszky moved to Los Angeles to continue his graduate studies at UCLA.

== Academic career ==
Sadovszky taught in Germany, and in the U.S. at UC Berkeley, UCLA, and the University of Nevada, Reno before joining the Cal State Fullerton in Orange County south of Los Angeles in 1971. He continued working there until his retirement in 1994, even after achieving professor emeritus status in 1991.

During his tenure as professor of anthropology at CSUF he claimed to have proven that almost 80 percent of the languages spoken by 19 Indian tribes in California are related to those spoken by two nations in Siberia. This became known as the Cal-Ugrian Theory.

=== Cal-Ugrian theory ===
Sadovszky elaborates the Cal-Ugrian theory in his 1996 book. The theory describes the proposed relationship between the Penutian languages native to California (itself a disputed hypothesis) and the Ob-Ugric languages spoken in Siberia. According to Sadovszky, this relationship is based on more than 10,000 different words and grammatical traits. The Penutian languages were or are spoken in an area along the Northern California coast from Bodega Bay to Big Sur as well as along the Sacramento and San Joaquin rivers; the Ob-Ugric languages by 6,000 Mansi and 17,000 Khanty, east of the Urals.

One claim of Sadovszky's theory is that the ancestors of some California tribes arrived only 3,000 years ago, which is much more recently than the origin of most tribes in the Americas which according to the generally accepted theory regarding the settlement of the Americas date their original migrations to around 20,000 years ago across the Bering Strait. In contrast, the migration around 1,000 B.C.E. would have occurred from the Ob river delta across the Arctic Ocean in summer months and down the American coast.

==== Criticism ====
The Cal-Ugrian theory was not well accepted in the United States, with some linguists noting that Sadovszky was not trained in comparative linguistics although he had done some fieldwork among California Indians. As a result, his book was published abroad, and the upshot was that he gained a reputation for his knowledge of Indo-European and Uralic languages but more so in Europe than in the United States. Evidence for a relatively recent marine migration is very limited, but Sadovszky claims that archaeological and other evidence back up the linguistic evidence of his theory but there has been little interest in further research in this area.

Specialists in the Uralic languages have generally rejected Sadovszky's theory, citing general lack of understanding of the methods of comparative linguistics, leading to his work being riddled with problems such as poor semantic and phonetic correspondences. Sadovszky often makes no effort to show that some material he compares is truly native within the two language groups he compares, often cherrypicking examples from just one or two of the dozens of languages encompassed by "Penutian".

The Dené-Yeniseian language theory linking a cluster of Siberian and Native American languages has been much better received than Sadovszky's theory.

== Selected works ==
- Shamanism past and present, I–II (1989)
- Shamans and Cultures (1993)
- Fish, Symbol and Myth (1995)
- Shamanism in performing arts (1995)
- Vogul folklore (1995)
- The Discovery of California: A Cal-Ugrian Comparative Study (1996)

== See also ==
- Dené–Yeniseian languages
