= Khanty languages =

Ugric language spoken in Siberia

Khanty
- Ostyak
- Geographic distribution: Khanty-Mansi, Russia
- Ethnicity: Khanty
- Native speakers: 14,000 (2020 census)
- Linguistic classification: Uralic: Finno-Ugric?; Ugric?; Ob-Ugric?; Khanty
- Subdivisions: Northern; Southern †; Eastern

Language codes
- ISO 639-3: kca
- Glottolog: khan1279 Khantyic
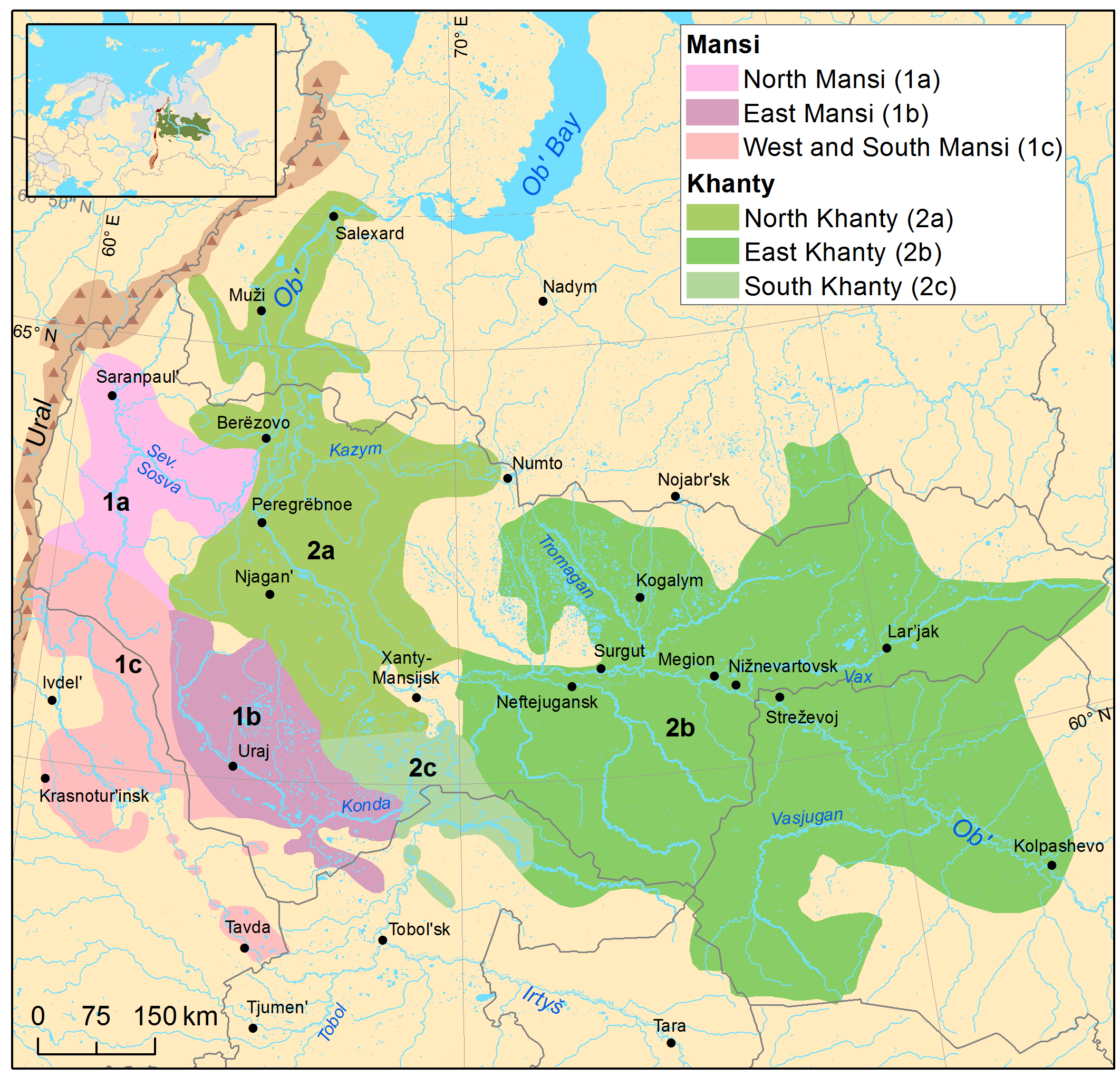
- Khanty and Mansi languages at the beginning of the 20th century

Khanty (also spelled Khanti or Hanti), previously known as Ostyak (/ˈɒstjæk/), is a branch of the Ugric languages composed of multiple dialect continua. It is varyingly considered a language or a collection of distinct languages spoken in the Khanty-Mansi and the Yamalo-Nenets Autonomous Okrugs in Siberia. It belongs to the wider Uralic language family. There were thought to be around 7,500 speakers of Northern Khanty and 2,000 speakers of Eastern Khanty in 2010, with Southern Khanty being extinct since the early 20th century. The number of speakers reported in the 2020 census was 13,900.

The Khanty language has many dialects. The western group includes the Obdorian, Ob, and Irtysh dialects. The eastern group includes the Surgut and Vakh-Vasyugan dialects, which in turn are subdivided into 13 other dialects. All these dialects differ significantly from each other by phonetic, morphological, and lexical features to the extent that the three main "dialects" (northern, southern and eastern) are mutually unintelligible. Thus, based on their significant multifactorial differences, Eastern, Northern and Southern Khanty may be considered separate but closely related languages.

== Literary languages ==
The Khanty language is spoken primarily in the Khanty–Mansi Autonomous Okrug in western Siberia

The Khanty written language was first created after the October Revolution on the basis of the Latin script in 1930 and then with the Cyrillic alphabet (with the additional letter ⟨ң⟩ for /ŋ/) from 1937.

Khanty literary works are usually written in three Northern dialects, Kazym, Shuryshkar and Middle Ob. Newspaper reporting and broadcasting are usually done in the Kazym dialect.

== Varieties ==
Language-dialects of Khanty (and Mansi): Obdorsk (Salekhard) dialect Ob dialects Southern (Irtysh) Khanty Surgut dialects Far Eastern (Vakh-Vasyugan) dialects

Khanty is divided in three main dialect groups, which are largely mutually unintelligible and therefore best considered three languages: Northern, Southern and Eastern. Individual dialects are named after the rivers on which they are or were spoken. Southern Khanty is now probably extinct.

Modern and or recent speaker areas of all Khanty varieties in detail

== Phonology ==
A general feature of all Khanty varieties is that long vowels are not distinguished, but a contrast between plain vowels (e.g. /o/) and reduced or extra-short vowels (e.g. /ŏ/) is found. That corresponds to a length distinction in Khanty's close relative, Mansi. According to scholars who posit a common Ob-Ugric ancestry for both, that was also the original Proto-Ob-Ugric situation.

Palatalization of consonants is phonemic in Khanty, as in most other Uralic languages. Retroflex consonants are also found in most varieties of Khanty.

Khanty word stress is usually on the initial syllable.

=== Proto-Khanty ===
		Bilabial	Dental	Palatal(ized)	Retroflex	Velar
Nasal		*m [m]	*n [n]	*ń [nʲ]	*ṇ [ɳ]	*ŋ [ŋ]
Stop/ Affricate		*p [p]	*t [t]	*ć [tsʲ]	*č̣ [ʈʂ]	*k [k]
Fricative	median		*s [s]			*γ [ɣ]
Fricative	lateral		*ᴧ [ɬ]			
Lateral			*l [l]	*ľ [lʲ]	*ḷ [ɭ]	
Trill			*r [r]			
Semivowel		*w [w]		*j [j]		

The 19 consonants reconstructed for Proto-Khanty are listed with the traditional UPA transcription, shown above, and an IPA transcription, shown below.

A major consonant isogloss among the Khanty varieties is the reflexation of the lateral consonants, *ɬ (from Proto-Uralic *s and *š) and *l (from Proto-Uralic *l and *ð). These generally merge, however with varying results: /l/ in the Obdorsk and Far Eastern dialects, /ɬ/ in the Kazym and Surgut dialects, and /t/ elsewhere. The Vasjugan dialect still retains the distinction word-initially and instead has shifted *ɬ > /j/ in this position. Similarly, the palatalized lateral *ľ developed to /lʲ/ in Far Eastern and Obdorsk, /ɬʲ/ in Kazym and Surgut, and /tʲ/ elsewhere. The retroflex lateral *ḷ remains in Far Eastern but in /t/-dialects develop into a new plain /l/.

Other dialect isoglosses include the development of original *ć to a palatalized stop /tʲ/ in Eastern and Southern Khanty but to a palatalized sibilant /sʲ ~ ɕ/ in Northern, as well as the development of original *č similarly to a sibilant /ʂ/ (= UPA: š) in Northern Khanty and partly also in Southern Khanty.

== Morphology ==
=== Noun ===
The nominal suffixes include dual -ŋən, plural -(ə)t, dative -a, locative/instrumental -nə.

For example:

xot "house" (cf. Finnish koti "home", or Hungarian ház)
xotŋəna "to the two houses"
xotətnə "at the houses" (cf. Hungarian házaknál, Finnish kotona "at home", an exceptional form using the old, locative meaning of the essive case ending -na).

Singular, dual, and plural possessive suffixes may be added to singular, dual, and plural nouns, in three persons, for 3^{3} = 27 forms. A few, from məs "cow", are:

məsem "my cow"

cow-SG-1S.POSS

məsŋǝtam "my two cows"

cow-DU-1S.POSS

məstam "my cows"

cow-PL-1S.POSS

məsmǝn "the two of our cow"

cow-SG-1D.POSS

məsŋǝtǝmǝn "the two of our two cows"

cow-DU-1D.POSS

məstǝmən "the two of our cows"

cow-PL-1D.POSS

məsew "our cow"

cow-SG-1P.POSS

məsŋǝtǝw "our two cows"

cow-DU-1P.POSS

mǝstǝw "our cows"

cow-PL-1P.POSS

==== Cases ====
1. Nominative case
2. Accusative case
3. Dative case
4. Lative case, merger of differentiated local cases that is used to indicate relative location.
5. Locative case Used to indicate place and direction.
6. Ablative case, external case used to mean moving away from something.
7. Approximative case, used to indicate a path towards.
8. Translative case, used to indicate transformation.
9. Instructive case (related to Instrumental case), as in something is an instrument for an action.
10. Comitative case, used to indicate that something is with (accompanying) X.
11. Abessive case, used to indicate that something is without x.

=== Pronouns ===
The personal pronouns are, in the nominative case:

	singular	dual	plural
1st person	ma	min	muŋ
2nd person	naŋ	nən	naŋ
3rd person	tuw	tən	təw

The cases of ma are accusative manət and dative manəm.

The demonstrative pronouns and adjectives are:

tamə "this", tomə "that", sit "that yonder": tam xot "this house".

Basic interrogative pronouns are:

xoy "who?", muy "what?"

=== Numerals ===
Khanty numerals, compared with Hungarian and Finnish, are:

Number	Khanty	Hungarian	Finnish
1	yit, yiy	egy	yksi
2	katn, kat	kettő, két	kaksi
3	xutəm	három	kolme
4	nyatə	négy	neljä
5	wet	öt	viisi
6	xut	hat	kuusi
7	tapət	hét	seitsemän
8	nəvət	nyolc	kahdeksan
9	yaryaŋ (Note: Possibly 'short of ten')	kilenc	yhdeksän
10	yaŋ	tíz	kymmenen
20	xus	húsz	kaksikymmentä
30	xutəmyaŋ (Note: 'three tens')	harminc	kolmekymmentä
40	nyatəyaŋ (Note: 'four tens')	negyven	neljäkymmentä
100	sot	száz	sata

The formation of multiples of ten shows Slavic influence in Khanty, whereas Hungarian uses the collective derivative suffix -van (-ven) closely related to the suffix of the adverbial participle which is -va (-ve) today but used to be -ván (-vén). Note also the regularity of [xot]-[haːz] "house" and [sot]-[saːz] "hundred".

=== Verbs ===
Khanty verbs must agree with the subject in person and number. There are two paradigms for conjugation. Subjective conjugation agrees only with the subject, and objective conjugation agrees with both the subject and the object. In a sentence with both a subject and an object, the subjective conjugation puts the object in focus, and the objective conjugation puts the object as a topic.

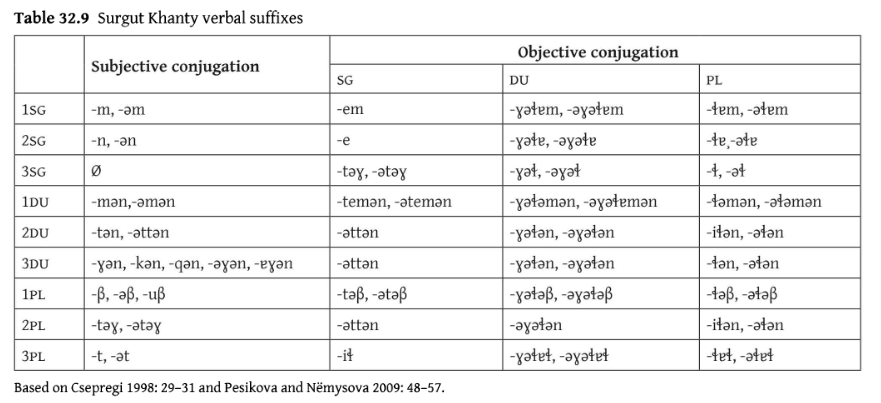
A table of verb suffixes in Khanty

Khanty has present and past tenses, indicative and imperative moods and passive and active voices. Generally, the present tense is marked, and the past is unmarked, but some verbs distinguish the present from the past by changing vowels or adding consonants. The order of suffixes is always tense-(passive.)number-person.

The non-finite verb forms are the infinitive, the converb and four participle verb forms. Infinitive can complement a modal verb or a motion verb such as go. If it is alone, necessity or possibility is meant.

The participles are present, past, negative and conditional. The first two are in use, and the last two are now scarcely used.

=== Questions ===
Yes/no questions are marked only by intonation. Indirect yes/no questions are constructed with "or" : S/he asked if Misha was tired [or not]. Wh-questions most often contain a wh-word in the focus position.

=== Negation ===
Negation is marked by the particle əntə, which appears adjacent to the verb and between the particles of particle verbs. That is different from other Uralic languages, which tend to have a negation verb or at least a negation particle that is inflected in some way.

== Syntax ==
Both Khanty and Mansi are basically nominative–accusative languages but have innovative morphological ergativity. In an ergative construction, the object is given the same case as the subject of an intransitive verb, and the locative is used for the agent of the transitive verb (as an instrumental). That may be used with some specific verbs such as for "to give", the literal translation would be "by me (subject) a fish (object) gave to you (indirect object)" for the equivalent of the sentence "I gave you a fish".

However, the ergative, since it is marked by using a case, is only morphological, not syntactic. In addition, it may be used in the passive voice in a way that resembles English. For example, in Mansi, the equivalent of "a dog (agent) bit you (object)" may be changed to "you (object) were bitten, by a dog (instrument)".

Khanty, an agglutinative language, has an SOV word order.

=== Word order ===
On the phrasal level, the traditional relations are typical for an OV language. For example, the verb may precede prepositional phrases, verb phrases precede manner adverbs and auxiliaries, and the possessor precedes the possessed.

On the sentence level, case alignment in Surgut Khanty clauses follows a nominative-accusative pattern. Both the subject and the object may be dropped if they are pragmatically inferable, possible even in the same sentence.

Khanty is usually a verb-final language, but about 10% of sentences have other phrases after the verb. The word order in matrix clauses is more variable but is quite strict in embedded clauses. Those constraints are caused by grammatical relations and discourse information. Those phrases used to have content that was already introduced in the discourse. However, newly introduced content may now be placed after the verb as well. Schön and Gugán speculate that to be caused by contact with Russian.

=== Imperative ===
Imperative clauses have the same structure as declarative sentences, apart from complex predicates, whose verb may precede the preverb. Prohibitive sentences include a prohibitive particle.

=== Passive ===
The passive voice is achieved by moving phrases other than the subject into the subject position to focus on the agent's indefiniteness.

=== Pro-drop ===
Nouns or pronouns may be dropped only if they are obvious from the context and marked by the verb.

== Lexicon ==
The Khanty varieties have a relatively well-documented lexicon. The most extensive early source is Toivonen (1948), based on field records by K. F. Karjalainen from 1898 to 1901. An etymological interdialectal dictionary, covering all known material from pre-1940 sources, is Steinitz et al. (1966–1993).

Schiefer (1972) summarizes the etymological sources of Khanty vocabulary, as per Steinitz et al., as follows:

Inherited	30%	Uralic	5%
Inherited	30%	Finno-Ugric	9%
Inherited	30%	Ugric	3%
Inherited	30%	Ob-Ugric	13%
Borrowed	28%	Komi	7%
Borrowed	28%	Samoyedic (Selkup and Nenets)	3%
Borrowed	28%	Tatar	10%
Borrowed	28%	Russian	8%
unknown	40%		

Futaky (1975) additionally proposes a number of loanwords from the Tungusic languages, mainly Evenki.
