= Mansi languages =

Ugric languages spoken in Siberia

Mansi
- Vogul, Mansic
- Geographic distribution: Khanty–Mansi, Sverdlovsk, Tyumen
- Ethnicity: Mansi
- Linguistic classification: Uralic: Finno-Ugric?; Ugric?; Ob-Ugric?; Mansi
- Subdivisions: Core Mansi; Southern Mansi †

Language codes
- ISO 639-3: mns
- Glottolog: mans1269
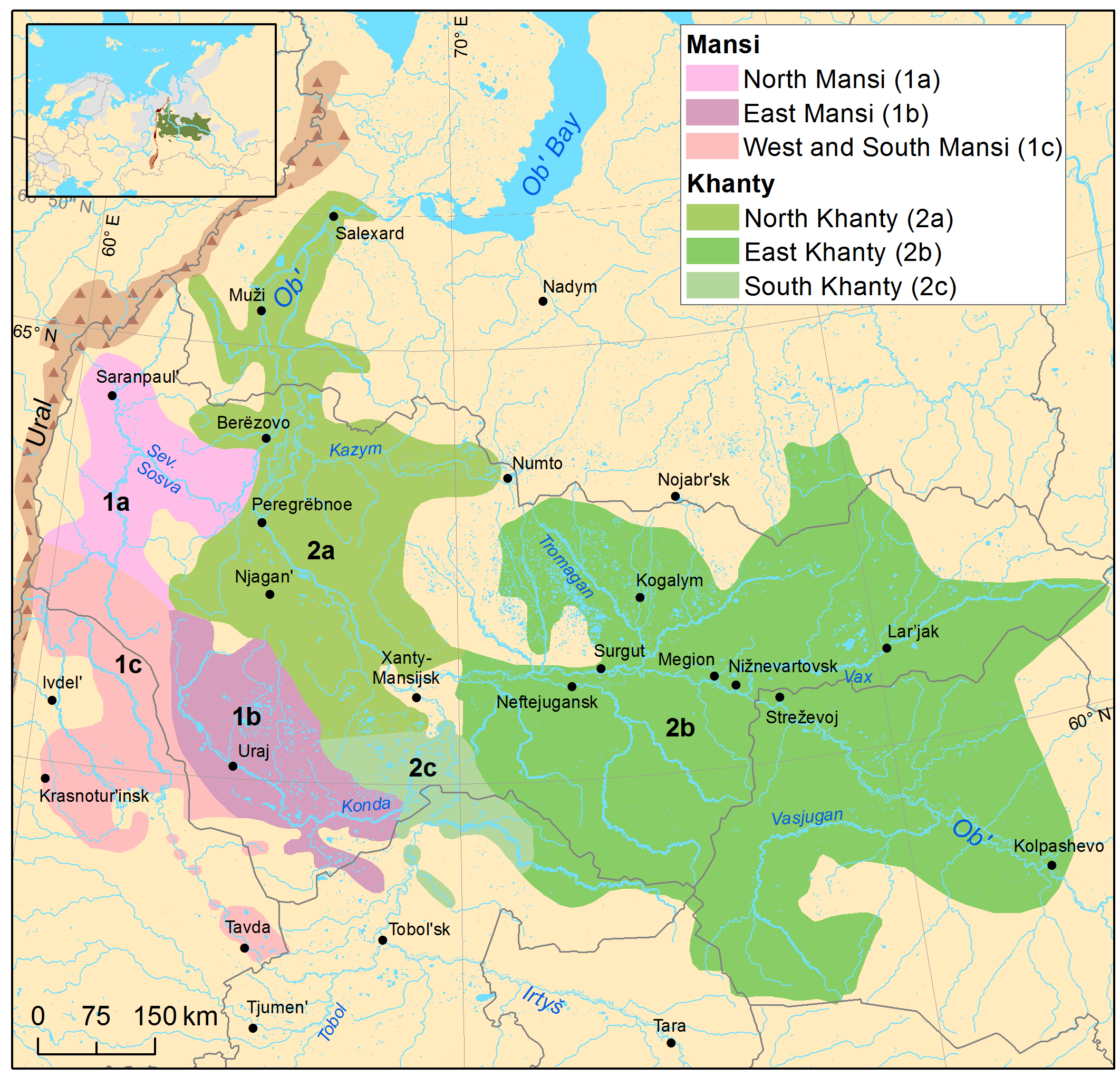
- Khanty and Mansi languages at the beginning of the 20th century

The Mansi languages, also known as the Vogul languages, are spoken by the Mansi people in Siberia, Russia along the Ob River and its tributaries, in the Khanty–Mansi Autonomous Okrug, and Sverdlovsk Oblast. Traditionally considered a single language, they constitute a branch of the Ugric languages, within the broader Uralic language family. They are often considered most closely related to neighbouring Khanty and then to Hungarian.

The base dialect of the Mansi literary language is the Sosva dialect, a representative of the northern language. Fixed word order is typical in Mansi. Adverbials and participles play an important role in sentence construction.

In the 2020–2021 census, 2229 people claimed to speak Mansi natively. All current speakers use Northern Mansi, as the other variants have become extinct.

== Dialects ==
Mansi is subdivided into four main dialect groups which are to a large degree mutually unintelligible, and therefore best considered four languages. A primary split can be set up between the Southern variety and the remainder. Several features are also shared between the Western and Eastern varieties, while certain later sound changes have diffused between Eastern and Northern (and are also found in some neighboring dialects of Northern Khanty to the east).

Individual dialects are known according to the rivers their speakers live(d) on:

- Mansi
  - Core Mansi
    - Northern Mansi
      - Upper Lozva
      - Severnaya Sosva
      - Sygva
      - Ob
    - Central Mansi †
      - Eastern Mansi (Konda) †
        - Lower Konda
        - Middle Konda
        - Upper Konda
        - Jukonda
      - Western Mansi †
        - Pelym
        - North Vagil
        - South Vagil
        - Lower Lozva
        - Middle Lozva
        - Vishera
  - Southern Mansi †
    - Tavda
    - Tagil
    - Tura
    - Chusovaya

The sub-dialects given above are those which were still spoken in the late 19th and early 20th century and have been documented in linguistic sources on Mansi, except for certain varieties of Western and Southern Mansi, spoken further west; the Tagil, Tura and Chusovaya dialects of Southern and the Vishera dialect of Western, found in pre-scientific records from the 18th and early 19th centuries.

The two dialects last mentioned were hence spoken on the western slopes of the Urals, where also several early Russian sources document Mansi settlements. By the late 18th century Western Mansi was still spoken in the vicinity of Cherdyn and Solikamsk and along the Southern Sosva. Placename evidence has been used to suggest Mansi presence reaching still much further west in earlier times, though this has been criticized as poorly substantiated.

Northern Mansi has strong Russian, Komi, Nenets, and Northern Khanty influence, and it forms the base of the literary Mansi language. There is no accusative case; that is, both the nominative and accusative roles are unmarked on the noun. */æ/ and */æː/ have been backed to [a] and [aː].

Western Mansi was described as "probably extinct" already in 1988. Although the last speaker is not known, it is considered certain that none were left at the end of the 20th century. It had strong Russian and Komi influences; dialect differences were also considerable. Long vowels were diphthongized.

Eastern Mansi became extinct in 2018, when its last speaker Maksim Šivtorov (Максим Семенович Шивторов) died. It has Khanty and Siberian Tatar influence. There is vowel harmony, and for */æː/ it has [œː], frequently diphthongized.

Southern (Tavda) Mansi was recorded from area isolated from the other Mansi varieties. Around 1900, a couple hundred speakers existed; in the 1960s, it was spoken only by a few elderly speakers, and it has since then become extinct. It had strong Tatar influence and displayed several archaisms such as vowel harmony, retention of /y/ (elsewhere merged with */æ/), /tsʲ/ (elsewhere deaffricated to /sʲ/), /æː/ (elsewhere fronted to /aː/ or diphthongized) and /ɑː/ (elsewhere raised to /oː/).

=== Comparison ===
English	Northern		Eastern		Western			Southern
English	Sosva	U. Lozva	Jukonda	Upper Konda	M. Lozva	L. Lozva	Tura	Tavda
I, me	ам (am)	ам (am)	а̊̄м (åm)	ом, ам (om, am)	äm	äm	амь (ам')	(äm)
you	наӈ (naŋ)	наӈ (naŋ)	нэй (näj)	нӓг (näγ)	näu	näi	наи (nai)	(nøu, nū)
water	вит (wit)	вит (wit)	вить (wiť)	вить (wiť)	wüť	üť	уть (uť)	(uť)
to go	минуӈкве (minuŋkwe)	минуӈкв (minuŋkw)	меных, менх (menəχ)	менх (menχ)	minuχ	minuχ		(mińəŋ)
woman	нэ̄ (nē)	нэ̄ (nē)	нэ̄ (nē)	нэ (ne)	nē	nē	не, нэ (n'e, ne)	(nī)
man	хум (χum)	хум (χum)	ха̊м (χåm)	ком (kom)	qum	qum		ком (kom)
boy	пыг (piγ)	пый (pij)	пӧв, пӱ̄в (pöw, pǖw)	пуу, пуув	pūγ	pǖ		(pū, pøw)
pine (Pinus sylvestris)	тарыг (tarəγ)	тарый (tarəj)	тӓрей (tärej)		täri	tøri		(tǟru ~ tøru ~ tāru, å̄nu)
word	ла̄тыӈ (lātəŋ)	ла̄тыӈ (lātəŋ)	ляӈх, лях (läŋχ, ľaŋχ/χ)	лах, лех (laχ, ľeχ)	lātəχ ~ lātəŋ			(ľēk)
good	ёмас (jomas)	ёмас (jomas)	ёмс, ёмщ (joms, jomś)	ямс (jams)	jäməs	jäməs	ямас (jamas)	(jumås, lǟk)
two	кит, китыг (kit, kitiγ)	кит, китый (kit, kitij)	кӣт, кӣтэй (kīt, kītej)	китэй (kitej)	kit	kit	кита (kita)	(kiťi)

== Phonology ==
=== Consonants ===
Proto-Mansi consonants
		Labial	Alveolar	(Alveolo-) Palatal	Post- alveolar	Velar	
		Labial	Alveolar	(Alveolo-) Palatal	Post- alveolar	Plain	Labialized
Nasal		*m	*n	*ń [nʲ]		*ŋ	*ŋ° [ŋʷ]
Stop		*p	*t	*ť [tʲ]		*k	*k° [kʷ]
Affricate				*ć [tɕ]			
Fricative	voiceless		*s		*š [ʂ]		
Fricative	voiced					*ɣ	*ɣ° [ɣʷ]
Semivowel				*j			*w
Lateral			*l	*ľ [lʲ]			
Trill			*r				

The majority of this inventory remains intact in the recorded Mansi varieties. The following are some of the main innovations:

1. *š merges with *s in most dialects of Northern and Eastern Mansi, though it is preserved in some of their easternmost varieties (Ob and Lower Konda).
2. *ć becomes a fricative ś, phonetically [sʲ] or [ɕ], everywhere outside Southern Khanty.
3. *k, *kʷ had uvular allophones *[q], *[qʷ] adjacent to original back vowels. These spirantize to voiceless fricatives /x/, /xʷ/ in Northern Mansi and the Lower Konda dialect of the Eastern group, which became phonemic due to vowel shifts.
4. *k, *kʷ spirantize to [x], [xʷ] also in syllable-final position across Western and Eastern Mansi.
5. The fricative *ɣ is in Southern Mansi either vocalized to /w/, /j/ or, after consonants, fortified to /k/.
6. Word-final *-əɣ vocalizes also in Eastern Mansi and most dialects of Western as *əj, realized as [iː] or [i].
7. According to Honti, a contrast between *w and *ɣʷ can be reconstructed, but this does not surface in any of the attested varieties.
8. The labialization contrast among the velars dates back to Proto-Mansi, but was in several varieties strengthened by labialization of velars adjacent to rounded vowels. In particular, Proto-Mansi *yK → Core Mansi *æKʷ (a form of transphonologization).

The fronting of *š, deaffrication of *ć and fricativization of *q have been noted to be areally shared with Northern Khanty.

=== Vowels ===
The vowel systems across Mansi show great variety. As typical across the Uralic languages, many more vowel distinctions were possible in the initial, stressed syllable than in unstressed ones. Up to 18–19 stressed vowel contrasts may be found in the Western and Eastern dialects. Northern Mansi has a much reduced, largely symmetric system, though lacking short [e] and having a long [iː]

short		long	
i	u	i:	u:
	o	e:	
	ɔ		ɔ:
	a		a:

== Grammar ==
=== Nouns ===
Mansi nouns inflect for number, case, and possession. For number, Mansi dialects inflect for singular, dual, and plural (with the exception of Southern Mansi, which did not have a dual number).

Northern Mansi has 6 cases: nominative, locative, lative-dative, ablative, instrumental, and translative (there is also a comitative suffix). Other Mansi dialects also have an accusative case. These are all expressed through suffixes:

Case	Suffix
Nominative	-∅
Locative	-t
Lative-Dative	-n, -na
Ablative	-nǝl
Instrumental	-l, -tǝl
Translative	-iɣ
Comitative	-na:t

== Written records ==
The oldest records of individual Mansi words (mainly proper names) in Russian documents date back to the 16th-17th centuries. In 1736, I. Kuroyedov, on behalf of Vasily Tatishchev, compiled the first “Dictionary of the Vogul language”. Later, other Mansi dictionaries appeared, both handwritten and printed - “Latin-Vogul dictionary” (1775), “A short Vogul dictionary with a Russian translation, collected and located on various materials, in the city of Solikamsk and the Holy Trinity Cathedral by Simeon Cherkalov in 1785”, “Comparative dictionaries of all languages and dialects, collected by the right hand of the highest person”, compiled by Peter Pallas (1787). In these works, which recorded Mansi words from various dialects, including those that have now disappeared, Cyrillic (more often) and Latin (less often) alphabets were used. In 1864, the first grammar of Western Mansi was published in Pest, compiled by Hunfalvy Pál (P. Hunfalvy. A. vogul föld és nép. Pest, 1864). In this work, the Latin alphabet was used.

In the 19th century, in connection with the Christianization of the Mansi, book publishing began directly in the Mansi language. The first Mansi book was the translation of the Gospel of Matthew into Konda Mansi, published in London in 1868. Another translation of the Gospel into the Mansi language (in Cyrillic with additional letters ӓ ј ӱ) was published in Helsinki in 1882. In 1903, the first Mansi primer appeared - "The Alphabet for the Voguls of the Urals", compiled by Bishop Nikanor in the Pelym dialect. In this primer, the then Russian alphabet was used without changes. All these publications did not receive any distribution among the Mansi.

A literary standard based on Northern Mansi, written first in the Latin alphabet and later in Cyrillic, was first designed and promoted among the Mansi themselves in the 1930s. Until this point, hunters used the rudiments of picture writing, which made it possible to describe the size of prey and the circumstances of the hunt. The system for writing numbers was well developed: numbers from one to four were denoted by vertical sticks │, the number 5 by an inclined stick ╱, 10 by a cross ╳, and 100 by an asterisk ✳. For example ╳╳╳╳╱││ meant 47.
