= Ugric languages =

Subdivision of the Uralic languages

Ugric
- Ugrian
- Geographic distribution: Hungary and Western Siberia
- Linguistic classification: Uralic: Ugric
- Subdivisions: Hungarian; Ob-Ugric?

Language codes
- Glottolog: None
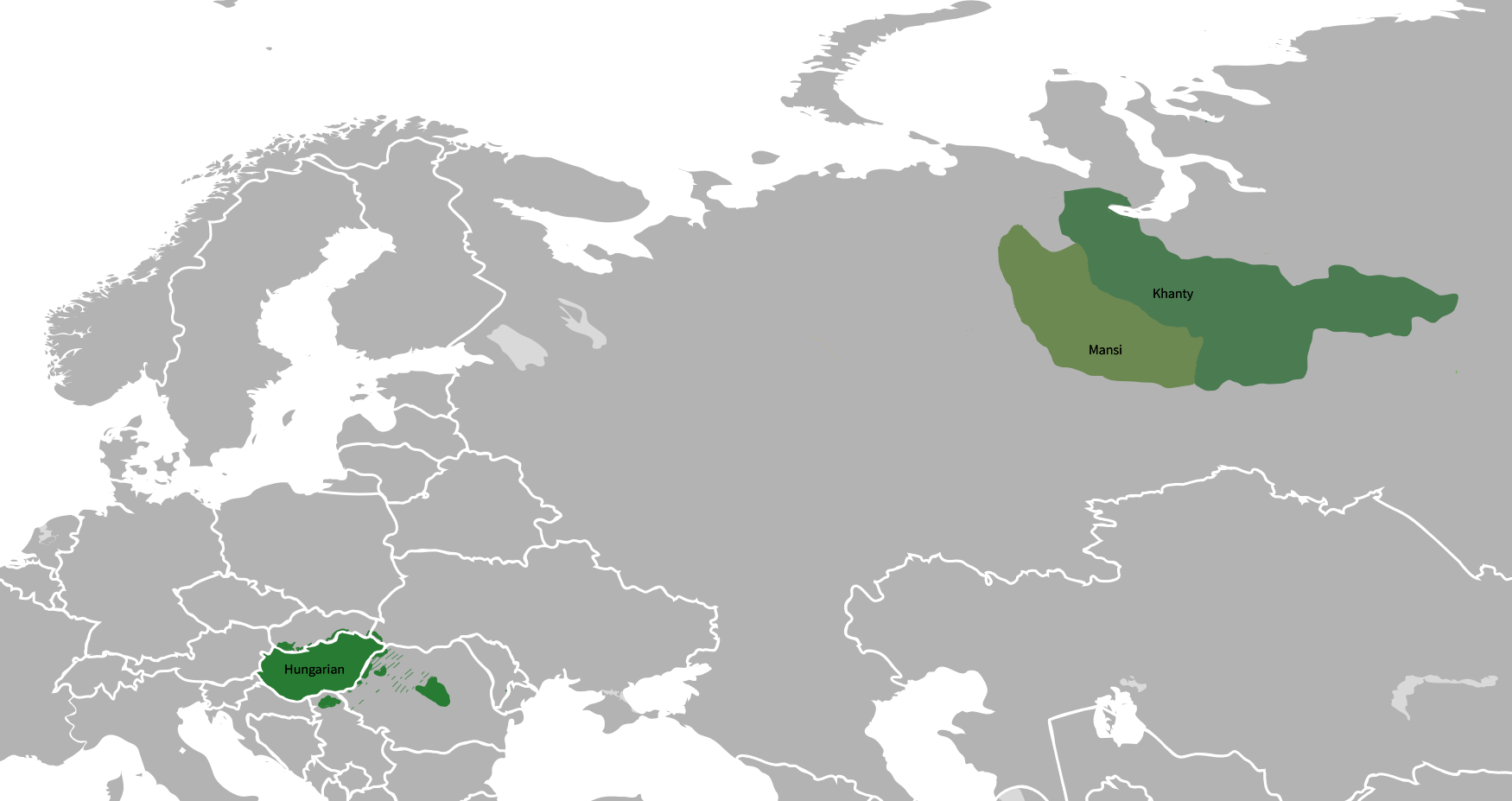
- The Ugric languages

The Ugric or Ugrian languages (/ˈjuːɡrɪk, ˈuː-/ or /ˈjuːɡriən, ˈuː-/) are a branch of the Uralic language family.

Ugric includes three subgroups: Hungarian, Khanty, and Mansi. The latter two are traditionally considered to be single languages, though they are sometimes considered to be small subdivisions of the Ugric language family due to considerable dialectical differences. A common Proto-Ugric language is posited to have been spoken from the end of the 3rd millennium BC until the first half of the 1st millennium BC in Siberia (North Asia). Of the three languages, Khanty and Mansi have sometimes been set apart from Hungarian as Ob-Ugric, though features uniting Mansi and Hungarian in particular are known as well.

The name Ugric is derived from ugry (угры), a Russian exonym of the Magyars (Hungarians) and also the name of the historical northern Russian region of Yugra. A connection between these words was first suggested in the beginning of 16th century. However, according to István Vásáry the etymological connection between these two words has not been verified, and the name Ugric is based on a folk etymology.

== Phonetic development ==
=== Consonants ===
Two common phonetic features of the Ugric languages are a rearrangement of the Proto-Uralic (PU) system of sibilant consonants and a lenition of velar consonants:

- PU *s and *š merged (possibly into [θ] or [ɬ]) and developed into a non-sibilant sound, yielding Mansi /t/, Khanty *ɬ → /t/ or /l/ (depending on dialect), and were lost in Hungarian.
- PU *ś depalatalized to *s.
- PU medial *x, *k, *w generally lenited to *ɣ.

It has however been pointed out that these changes are applicable to the Samoyedic languages as well.

The consonant cluster *lm is in the Ugric languages mostly reduced to a single /m/ (e.g. PU *śilmä 'eye' → Hungarian szem, Mansi сам /sam/, Khanty сем /sem/). A peculiar exception is the numeral '3', in which Hungarian (három) and Mansi (хурэм /xuːrəm/) point to an original cluster *rm, whereas the rest of the Uralic family suggests original *lm (Khanty холәм, Finnish kolme, Estonian kolm, Inari Sami kulma, Erzya колмо, etc.) This has frequently been listed as an argument for considering Hungarian more closely related to Mansi than Khanty. The reverse has also been suggested—Hungarian and Mansi retaining the original form of the numeral, whereas Khanty and all the Finno-Permic languages would have innovated /l/ for some reason. Perhaps due to analogy with number 4, "*neljä".

Hungarian and the current literary standards of Mansi and Khanty all share a spirantization of Proto-Uralic *k to /h/ or /x/ before back vowels, e.g. 'fish': PU *kala → Hungarian hal, Mansi хул /xuːl/, Khanty хул /xul/. This is itself not a common Ugric feature — /k/ remains in other Mansi and Khanty dialects (e.g. Eastern Khanty /kul/, Southern Mansi /koːl/ 'fish'), but it has been argued to result from a proto-Ugric split of *k to front and back allophones [k] ~ [q], with the latter then independently spirantizing in each three cases.

The three Ugric varieties also share the lateralization of Proto-Uralic *δ to *l (as do the Permic languages), but it is possible this postcedes the emergence of retroflex *ɭ from PU *l in Khanty. Another possible counterargument is the similar lateralization of the palatalized counterpart *δ́ → Mansi /lʲ/, likely to have been a simultaneous change with the lateralization of *ð. In Khanty the reflex is /j/, whereas instances of /lʲ/ also exist, which may suggest a separate development. An original *ĺ is no longer reconstructed for older stages of Uralic, however, which leaves the origin of Khanty /lʲ/ an open question.

An innovation clearly limited to the Ugric languages is the development of *ŋ to *ŋk, though there are numerous exceptions in each language to this.

=== Vowels ===
The development of the vowel system remains subject to interpretation. All three Ugric branches contrast vowel length; in Hungarian this is late, generally derived by compensatory lengthening after loss of unstressed vowels and *ɣ. The Ob-Ugric languages, however, derive their quantity contrasts mainly from PU quality contrasts: thus for example in Northern Mansi, PU *peljä 'ear' → *päĺ → /palʲ/, but PU *pälä 'half' → *pääl → /paːl/.

Contrasts between PU stem vowels (*a/*ä vs. *i) do not survive as such in modern Ugric languages, but they commonly leave their mark on vowel qualities in the first syllable, suggesting retention of the contrast at least to the Proto-Ugric stage. For example, PU *ńïxli 'arrow' → Hungarian nyíl, but PU *mïksa 'liver' → Hungarian máj. Remnants of original stem vowels are also found in the oldest Hungarian records, such as PU *konta 'group, hunting party' → Old Hungarian hodu 'army' (→ Modern Hungarian had).

== Lexical features ==
The Ugric languages share considerable amounts of common lexicon not found in the other Uralic languages. This includes both basic vocabulary, e.g. 'fire' (Hungarian tűz, Mansi таўт /taːwt/, Khanty тут /tut/) as well as more specialized terminology, particularly the word for 'horse' (H ló, lov-, M луў /luw/, Kh лав /law/) and related items such as 'saddle' (H nyereg, M нагэр /naɣər/). This latter fact together with an importance of horse motifs in Ob-Ugric folklore has been used to argue for locating Proto-Ugric in the southernmost parts of Siberia, in close contact with nomadic steppe peoples if not nomadic themselves. Some loanwords from such sources into Ugric are known as well, perhaps most prominently the numeral '7': *θäpt(V) → H hét, (Note: The initial /h/ is unetymological, and has been explained as influence of the adjacent numeral hat '6'.) M сат /sat/, Kh тапәт /tapət/ (from an Indo-Iranian source; cf. Sanskrit saptá, Avestan hapta, both from Proto-Indo-Iranian *saptá < Proto-Indo-European *septḿ̥).

Endonyms of two of the Ugric peoples are cognate as well: the root of Hungarian magyar 'Hungarian' can be equated with Mansi (from an original root *mäńć-). A related word, 'mańt́' in Khanty denotes a specific phratry.

A common derivational innovation is seen in the word for 'louse': Proto-Uralic *täji → *tä(j)-ktVmV → H tetű, M такэм, Kh тевтәм.

Holopainen (2023) argues that many known loanwords and suspectable substrate vocabulary show too much irregularity in sound correspondences to be derived from a common Ugric proto-language, and may have been borrowed independently into Hungarian and Ob-Ugric, or even all three of Hungarian, Mansi and Khanty; while for others, it is unclear if they were actually innovated, or represent rather common retention from Proto-Uralic.

== Structural features ==
- An original ablative case marked by -l
- A series of original locative cases, formed from postpositions derived from a pronoun root *nä
- Possessive suffixes are placed before case suffixes, not after them as in the other Uralic languages
- A class of "instable" verb stems, in which alternation between CV and CVC stem variants occurs, e.g. ‘to take’: Hungarian ve- ~ vev- ~ vesz-, Mansi *wi- ~ *wæj-, Khanty *wĕ- ~ *wĕj-.
- Distinct attributive and nominal forms of the numeral '2': Hungarian két vs. kettő, Mansi кит vs. китиг, Khanty (Northern) кат vs. катән, (Eastern) /kæt/ vs. /kætəɣ/
- Found in Hungarian and Mansi, an extended form of the caritive suffix containing -l.
- Distinct verb conjugations according to the transitivity of the verb. It is sometimes termed as “definite” versus “indefinite” conjugation, because also the definiteness of the object can play a role when selecting between the two. This feature is within the Uralic family also found in the Mordvinic languages, and it is likely to not represent a common Ugric innovation; the particular details of the construction are different in all three Ugric languages.
- Verbal prefixes, which modify the meaning of the verb in both concrete and abstract ways

Examples from Mansi

ēl(a) – 'forwards, onwards, away'

jōm- 'to go, to stride'	ēl-jōm- 'to go away/on'
tinal- 'to sell'	ēl-tinal- 'to sell off'

xot – 'direction away from something and other nuances of action intensity'

min- 'to go'	xot-min- 'to go away, to stop'
roxt- 'to be frightened'	xot-roxt- 'to take fright suddenly'

Examples from Hungarian

el – 'away, off'

ugrik 'to jump'	elugrik 'to jump away'
mosolyog 'to smile'	elmosolyodik 'to start to smile' (implying a lack of control)

ki – 'out (of)'

ugrik 'to jump'	kiugrik 'to jump out'
néz 'to look'	kinéz 'to look out'

In Hungarian, the citation form of verbs is the present tense indicative of the 3rd person singular form, which is given here, which does not have any suffixes.

== Citations ==
- Honti, László (1979). "Features of Ugric Languages (Observations on the Question of Ugric Unity)". Acta Linguistica Academia Scientiarum Hungaricae. 29: 1–25.
- Honti, László (1998). "Ugrilainen kantakieli – erheellinen vai reaalinen hypoteesi?". Suomalais-Ugrilaisen Seuran Toimituksia. 228. ISBN 952-5150-15-1.
- Riese, Timothy (2001). Vogul: Languages of the World/Materials 158. Lincom Europa. ISBN 3-89586-231-2.
- Törkenczy, Miklós (1997). Hungarian Verbs & Essentials of Grammar. Passport Books. ISBN 0-8442-8350-9.
