= Ob-Ugric languages =

Group of Western Siberian languages

Ob-Ugric
- (controversial)
- Geographic distribution: Western Siberia
- Ethnicity: Ob-Ugrians
- Linguistic classification: Uralic: Finno-Ugric?; Ugric?; Ob-Ugric
- Subdivisions: Khanty (Ostyak); Mansi (Vogul)

Language codes
- Glottolog: None
- Distribution of modern Ob-Ugric languages combined 75%-100% 35%-75% 15%-35% 15%-0%

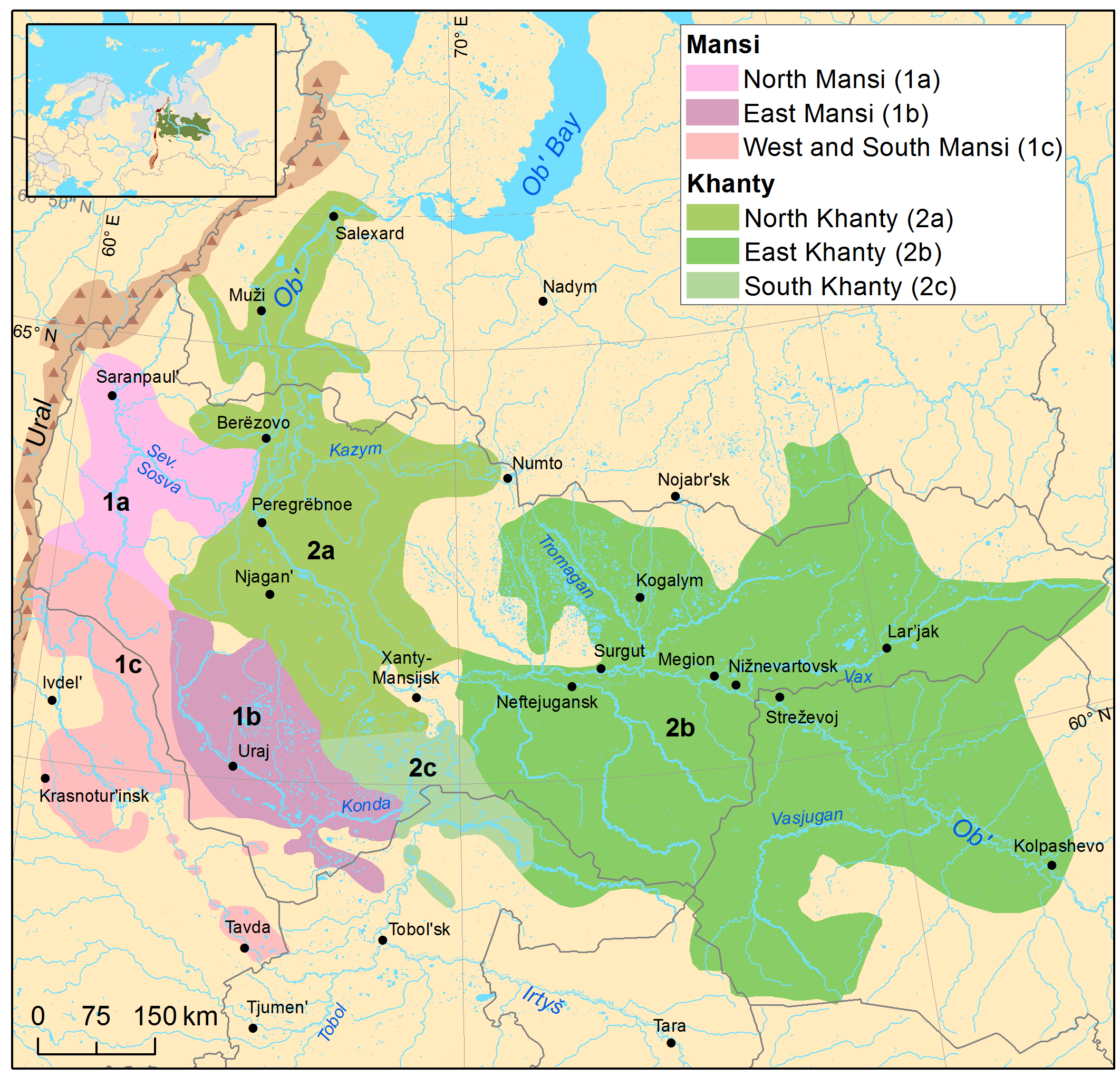
Ob-Ugric languages at the beginning of the 20th century

The Ob-Ugric languages are a commonly proposed branch of the Uralic languages, grouping together the Khanty (Ostyak) and Mansi (Vogul) languages. Both languages are split into numerous and highly divergent dialects, more accurately referred to as languages. The Ob-Ugric languages and Hungarian comprise the proposed Ugric branch of the Uralic language family.

The languages are spoken in the region between the Urals and the Ob River and the Irtysh in central Russia. The forests and forest steppes of the southern Urals are thought to be the original homeland of the Ugric branch. Beginning some 500 years ago the arrival of the Russians pushed the speakers eastward to the Ob and Irtysh. Some Mansi speakers remained west of the Urals until as late as the early 20th century. Hungarian split off during the 11th century BC. The Ob-Ugric languages have also been strongly influenced by nearby Turkic languages, especially Tatar.

Mansi has about 1,000 speakers while Khanty has about 10,000 speakers, all within Russia. Until 1930, these languages had no written or literary traditions, but since 1937 have used a modified Cyrillic alphabet. However, no significant texts have been created in these languages and they have few official usages.

The term Ob-Ugric was introduced by the Finnish linguist August Ahlqvist who made expeditions to Western Siberia in 1858 and 1877 to study the Khanty and Mansi languages.

== Nature of the relationship ==
The status of the Ob-Ugric languages as a close areal grouping is clear, with adjacent varieties regularly sharing isoglosses and having loaned vocabulary back and forth (as well as from common external sources, e.g. from eastern dialects of Komi into northern dialects of Mansi and Khanty). This effect is particularly clear between the more eastern and northern varieties of Mansi, and the more western varieties of Khanty. Modern-day Northern Mansi and Northern Khanty continue to affect each other's evolution. Some areal similarities are also shared with their eastern Samoyedic relatives, in particular between Khanty and Selkup, but also Forest Nenets. The relationship to Hungarian is looser: in their current state, the Ob-Ugric languages are radically different from Hungarian in phonology, syntax, and vocabulary.

The existence of a common Ob-Ugric period after the separation from Hungarian and the rest of Uralic is not universally accepted: some linguists treat all common features of Mansi and Khanty as either later convergence under mutual influence, or retentions from the common Ugric and earlier periods. Most Uralic classifications group Khanty and Mansi together even if they reject Ugric, but Salminen (2007) and Janhunen (2009) reject Ob-Ugric as well. (Janhunen classifies Hungarian and Mansi together, omitting Khanty.) Glottolog and Ethnologue take the agnostic approach of Salminen.

Typological features distinguishing the Ob-Ugric languages include:

- The lack of a systematic voicing contrast. /ɣ/, however, is a frequent consonant word-medially.
- Retention of Proto-Uralic word-initial *w as /w/. (Also a feature of Nenets.)
- Vowel harmony is found in the most archaic varieties, southern Mansi and eastern Khanty.
- Ablaut of vowels, particularly in eastern Khanty
- In the northern dialects: a change *k → /x/ before back vowels. (A similar change also occurred in Hungarian.)
- Retention of subject–object–verb (SOV) word order
- Retention of dual number
- Partial or full replacement of the original 2nd person pronominal and suffixal elements; marked by the consonant /t/ in most Uralic languages but for the most part /n/ in Ob-Ugric.
- A smaller case system than in other Uralic languages, including a lack of the genitive case.
