= Estonian vocabulary =

Vocabulary of Estonian language

Estonian vocabulary, i.e., the vocabulary of the Estonian language, was influenced by many other language groups.

== Germanic languages ==
The heaviest external contribution, nearly one third of the vocabulary, comes from Germanic languages, mainly from Low Saxon (Middle Low German) during the period of German rule, and High German (including standard German). The percentage of Low Saxon and High German loanwords can be estimated at 22–25 percent, with Low Saxon making up about 15 percent.

== Ex nihilo lexical enrichment ==
Estonian language planners such as Ado Grenzstein (a journalist active in Estonia in the 1870s–90s) tried to use formation ex nihilo, Urschöpfung, i.e. they created new words out of nothing but gibberish and nonsense. Examples are Ado Grenzstein's coinages kabe ‘draughts, chequers’ and male ‘chess’.

The most famous reformer of Estonian, Johannes Aavik (1880–1973), also used creations ex nihilo (cf. ‘free constructions’, Tauli 1977), along with other sources of lexical enrichment such as derivations, compositions and loanwords (often from Finnish; cf. Saareste and Raun 1965: 76). Aavik belonged to the so-called Noor Eesti (‘Young Estonia’) movement, which appeared in Tartu, a university town in south-eastern Estonia, around 1905 (for discussion, see Raun 1991). In Aavik's dictionary (1921), which lists approximately 4000 words, there are many words which were (allegedly) created ex nihilo. Consider • ese ‘object’, • kolp ‘skull’, • liibuma ‘to cling’, • naasma ‘to return, come back’, • nõme ‘stupid, dull’, • range ‘strict’, • reetma ‘to betray’, • solge ‘slim, flexible, graceful’ (which did not gain currency, cf. Contemporary Estonian graatsiline ‘graceful’, although the word itself is used for a parasitic worm, namely Ascaris lumbricoides), and • veenma ‘to convince’. Other Aavikisms ex nihilo (not appearing in Aavik 1921) include • nentima ‘to admit, state’, • nördima ‘to grow indignant’, • süüme ‘conscience’, and • tõik ‘fact’."

Note, however, that many of the coinages that have been considered (often by Aavik himself) as words concocted ex nihilo could well have been influenced by foreign lexical items, for example words from Russian, German, French, Finnish, English and Swedish. Aavik had a broad classical education and knew Ancient Greek, Latin and French. Consider • relv ‘weapon’ versus English revolver, • roim ‘crime’ versus English crime, • siiras ‘sincere’ versus English sincere/serious • embama ‘to embrace’ versus English embrace, and • taunima ‘to condemn, disapprove’ versus Finnish tuomita ‘to judge’ (these Aavikisms appear in Aavik's 1921 dictionary). Consider also • evima ‘to have, possess, own’ (cf. also Estonian omama ‘to own’, and mul on, lit. ‘to me is’, i.e. ‘for me there is’, meaning ‘I have’) versus English have; • laup ‘forehead’ versus Russian лоб lob ‘forehead’; • mõrv ‘murder’ and mõrvama ‘to murder’ versus English murder and German Mord (these Aavikisms do not appear in Aavik 1921); and • laip ‘corpse’ versus German Leib ‘body’ and German Leiche ‘body, corpse’. These words might be better regarded as a peculiar manifestation of morpho-phonemic adaptation of a foreign lexical item. The often irregular and arbitrary sound changes could then be explained not as subconscious foreign influence but rather as conscious manipulation by the coiner. Aavik seems to have paid little attention to the origin of his neologisms. On occasion, he replaced existing native words or expressions with neologisms of foreign descent. Therefore, Aavik cannot be considered a purist in the traditional sense, i.e. he was not ‘anti-foreignisms/loanwords’ as such.

== Tables of word origin ==
=== Inherited vocabulary ===
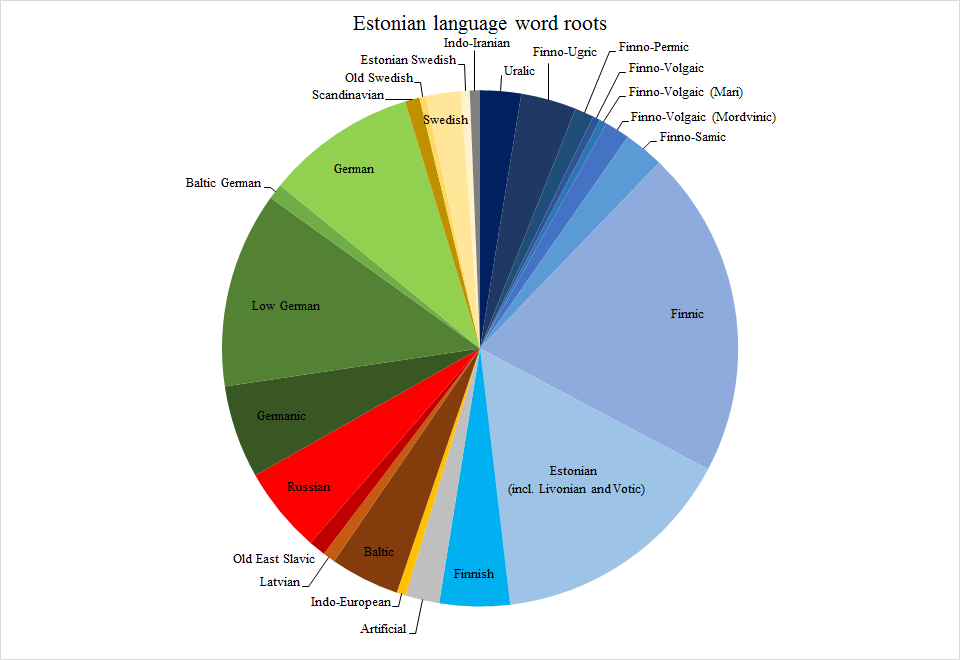
Approximate share of root word origins in Estonian.

Inherited vocabulary in Estonian can be classified according to how far off they have cognates among the other Uralic languages.

- "Uralic" words have known cognates in the Samoyedic languages.
- "Finno-Ugric" words have known cognates at furthest in the Ugric languages.
- "Finno-Permic" words have known cognates at furthest in the Permic languages.
- "Finno-Volgaic" words have known cognates at furthest in the Mari language or the Mordvinic languages (formerly known as "Volgaic").
- "Finno-Samic" words have known cognates at furthest in the Samic languages.
- "Finnic" words have known cognates only among the Finnic languages.

All these groups correspond to different proposed subgroups of the Uralic languages. However, the historical reality of most groupings is disputed. In principle e.g. a "Finno-Permic" word may be just as old as a "Uralic" word, just one whose descendants have not survived to the modern Samoyedic and Ugric languages.

Proposed origin	No. of word roots	Examples by semantic area		
Proposed origin	No. of word roots	Nature and the body	Cultural concepts	Abstract concepts
Uralic	120	Anatomy: keel 'tongue; language', kõrv 'ear', luu 'bone', maks 'liver', põlv 'knee', põsk 'cheek', silm 'eye', muna 'egg', neelama 'to swallow', pala 'piece', sulg 'feather' States: elama 'to live; to dwell', koolma 'to die, pass away, decease', pelgama 'to be afraid, fear', tundma 'to feel' Environment: suvi 'summer', päev 'day', kaja 'echo', kuu 'moon, Luna', lumi 'snow', soo 'marsh, bog, swamp', vesi 'water', juga 'jet; falls, waterfall' Plants: puu 'tree', kuusk 'spruce, fir(-tree)', kõiv 'birch', murakas 'cloudberry' Animals: kala 'fish', küü 'snake; blindworm', sisalik 'lizard'	Technology: tuli 'fire', süsi 'ember(s), coal', suusk 'ski', nool 'arrow', pura 'auger', sõudma 'to row', punuma 'to knit', vask 'copper', vöö 'belt, girdle'; pada 'pot', leem 'soup, broth, brew' Society: vägi 'power, vigour, strength, might, force', sala 'secretly', naine 'woman', nimi 'name'	Basic actions: minema 'to go', tulema 'to come', ujuma 'to swim', kaduma 'to disappear', mõskma 'to wash' Locations: ala 'under, sub', üla 'upper, top', esi 'front', taga 'behind' Grammatical: m(in)a 'I', s(in)a 'thou', see 'this, it', kes 'who', mis 'what', too 'that', ei 'no' Numerals: kaks 'two', viis 'five'
Finno-Ugric	270	Anatomy: aju 'brain', üdi 'marrow', hing 'soul', huul 'lip', pea 'head', pii 'tooth', päkk 'ball of the foot', sapp 'gall, bile', vats 'belly, stomach' Environment: ilm 'weather, air', jää 'ice', koit 'dawn, daybreak, Aurora', talv 'winter', sügis 'autumn', voor 'drumlin' Plants: paju 'willow', pihl 'rowan', kask 'birch', mari 'berry', pohl 'cowberry' Animals: kamar 'rind', nugis 'marten', siil 'hedgehog', hiir 'mouse', püü 'grouse', mõtus 'capercaillie', vares 'crow', pääsuke 'swallow', säga 'catfish', säinas 'ide', särg 'roach', täi 'louse', kusilane 'ant', koi 'moth, bug'	Technology: põlema 'burn, blaze', küdema 'burn, heat', või 'butter', väits 'knife', vestma 'carve', sau 'clay; stock for walking'; sõba 'robe' ise 'self', iga 'age' Society: küla 'village'; isa 'father', poeg 'son', küdi 'brother-in-law', kond '-hood', nõid 'witch', sepp 'blacksmith'	aru 'sense, reason' Adjectives: valge 'white', hahk 'gray; eider', süva 'deep-seated, profound', uus 'new' Numerals: üks 'one', kolm 'three', neli 'four', kuus 'six'
Finno-Permic	50–140	Anatomy: kõht 'stomach', kõri 'throat', säär 'leg, shank' Environment: koobas 'cave', põrm 'dust, earth' Plants: peda(jas) 'pine tree', kuslapuu 'honeysuckle', oks 'branch', pähkel 'nut', kiud 'fiber' Animals: kotkas 'eagle', orav 'squirrel', peni 'dog', sõnnik 'dung'	rehi 'threshing barn', kuduma 'to weave, to knit', amb 'crossbow', mõla 'oar, paddle', õng 'angle', äi 'father-in-law', äike 'thunder'	parem 'right, better', vana 'old', lõuna 'south, midday', meel 'mind'
Finno-Volgaic	100–150	Anatomy: selg 'back', koon 'snout', käpp 'paw' Environment: kevad 'spring', täht 'star', järv 'lake' Plants: haab 'aspen', saar 'ash tree', tamm 'oak', vaher 'maple', sarapuu 'hazel', õlg 'straw' Animals: lehm 'cow', siga 'pig', kurg 'crane, stork', kurvits 'sandpiper', parm 'horse fly', sääsk 'midge'	vaim 'spirit', pett 'buttermilk', jahvatama to grind'; keema 'to boil', hiilgama 'to glow, to gleam', käis 'sleeve', piir 'border'; vene 'boat'; lell 'uncle, father's brother', kargama 'to jump', pesema 'to wash', püsima 'to stay, to remain', lüpsma 'to milk'	Adjectives: aher 'barren', jahe 'cool', kõva 'hard', süva 'deep'
Finno-Samic	130–150	vihm 'rain', sammal 'moss', org 'valley', vili 'grain, fruit', põõsas 'bush', põud 'drought'	veli 'brother', ime 'miracle', luule 'poetry'	õnn 'happiness, fortune', taga 'back, behind', tõsi 'truth', nälg 'hunger', küll 'surely'
Finnic	600–800	higi 'sweat', külg 'side'; põder 'elk', oja 'stream', udu 'fog', hobu 'horse', jänes 'hare', konn 'frog', mänd 'pine tree', neem 'cape', saar 'island'	aeg 'time', eile 'yesterday'; laps 'child', rahvas 'people', linn 'town'; nuga 'knife', king 'shoe'	kõne 'talk, speech', sõna 'word'; julge 'bold'

=== Loanwords ===
Proposed origin	No. of word roots	Period	Examples
Proto-Indo-European loans (hypothetical)	appr. 50	5000–3000 BC	koib 'leg', kube 'groin', liha 'meat', lõug 'chin', nahk 'skin, leather', rind 'breast'; mägi 'hill, mountain', ahven 'perch', koger 'crucian carp', koha 'pike-perch', rääbis 'vendace', siig 'whitefish', vimb 'vimba bream'; helmes 'bead'
Indo-European and Indo-Iranian loans	20–45	3000–1000 BC	jumal 'god', koda 'house, hall', mesi 'honey', sool 'salt', osa 'part', sada 'hundred', põrsas 'piglet', rebane 'fox', varss 'calf', sarv 'horn', puhas 'clean', utt 'ewe', vasar 'hammer', vedama 'to pull, draw, drag, carry, drive'
Proto-Baltic and Baltic loans	100–150	1500–500 BC	hammas 'tooth', hani 'goose', hein 'hay', hernes 'pea', hõim 'tribe', oinas 'wether', puder 'porridge', põrgu 'hell', ratas 'wheel', seeme 'seed', sein 'wall', mets 'forest', luht 'waterside meadow', sõber 'friend', tuhat 'thousand', vagu 'furrow', regi 'sledge', vill 'wool', veel 'more, still', kael 'neck', kirves 'axe', laisk 'lazy'
Proto-Germanic and Germanic loans	380	2000 BC – 13th century	Agriculture: agan, ader 'plough', humal, kana 'hen', kaer 'oats', rukis 'rye', lammas 'sheep', leib 'bread', põld 'field' Fishing and seafaring: aer 'oar', mõrd 'fish trap', laev 'ship', noot 'seine, sweep net', puri 'sail' Metals: kuld 'gold', raud 'iron', tina 'tin' Products: sukk 'stocking', katel 'kettle', küünal 'candle', taigen 'dough' Society: kuningas 'king', laen 'loan', luna 'ransom, bail', raha 'money', rikas 'rich', vald 'parish, community' Nature: kalju 'rock', kallas 'shore', rand 'coast' Other: arbuma 'to magic, charm', tabama 'to catch, seize, capture, hit', armas 'dear', taud 'disease', kaunis 'beautiful', ja 'and'
Old Slavic loans	50–75	10th–13th century	aken 'window', haug 'pike', kasukas 'fur coat' sahk 'plough', sirp 'sickle', turg 'market', teng(elpung) 'money' Religion: pagan 'heathen', papp 'priest', raamat 'book', rist 'cross'
Proto-Latvian loans	40	6th–7th century	kanep 'hemp', lääts 'lentil', magun 'poppy', udras 'otter', kõuts 'tomcat', palakas 'sheet', lupard 'rag', harima 'cultivate, educate, clean', kukkel 'bun', vanik 'garland', laabuma 'to thrive', kauss 'bowl', mulk 'inhabitant of Viljandi county', pastel 'leather slipper'
Low Saxon loans	750	12th–16th century	kool 'school', uurima 'to search, study, survey', neer 'kidney', ribi 'rib'; hunt 'wolf; hound', piik 'spike, lance', just 'just, namely', kruus 'gravel', torm 'storm'; plaaster 'tape, plaster'; hangeldama 'smuggle', küürima 'scour', tingima 'to bargain', toober 'tub', tiik 'pond', lamp 'lamp', lühter 'chandelier', näärid 'new year', reede 'Friday' Botany: kõrvits 'pumpkin', peet 'beet', salat 'salad', petersell 'parsley', münt 'coin', köömen 'caraway, cumin', loorber 'laurel', palm 'palm (tree)', tamm 'dam', roos 'rose', ploom 'plum' Culinary: köök 'kitchen', kruubid 'groat', kringel 'kringle, type of pastry', pannkook 'pancake', pekk 'lard', prantssai 'type of pastry', sült 'brawn', vorst 'sausage', õli 'oil', tärklis 'starch', pruukost 'breakfast', kruus 'mug', pann 'pan', pütt 'barrel', korv 'basket', lähker 'bota' Clothing: käärid 'scissors', teljed 'looms', vokk 'spinning wheel', lõuend 'canvas', samet 'velvet', siid 'silk', vilt 'felt', kuub 'coat', kört 'skirt', loor 'veil', müts 'cap', muda 'mud', mantel 'coat', püksid 'pants, trousers', vammus 'coat', nööp 'button' Architecture: hoov 'courtyard', häärber 'mansion', kelder 'cellar', kemmerg 'toilet', korsten 'chimney', ruum 'room', saal 'hall', tall 'stables', trepp 'stairs', vall 'wall, ridge', võlv 'vault' Technology: haamer 'hammer', hing 'hinge', höövel 'planer', kellu 'trowel', kapp 'cupboard', pink 'bench', tool 'stool'; jaht 'hunt', jääger 'hunter, hunt manager, game warden', kants 'stronghold', kütt 'hunter', laager 'camp', lahing 'battle', püss 'gun, rifle', tääk 'bayonet', vaht 'watch' Religion: altar 'altar', ingel 'angel', jünger 'disciple', psalm 'psalm', prohvet 'prophet', salm 'verse', preester 'priest', troost 'consolation', pihtima 'to confess', vöörmünder 'church warden, beadle', piiskop 'bishop', sant 'beggar, cripple' People: preili 'miss, maiden', memm 'old woman', mats 'boor, hick', härra 'gentleman', proua 'lady', kelm 'dodger, rascal, cheat', narr 'joker, fool', naaber 'neighbour', kuller 'courrier', laat 'fair, market', selts 'society, club', krahv 'count', saks 'German, nobleman', arst 'doctor' Measures: kortel 'quartern', matt 'a measure', toll 'inch', vaagima 'to weigh', viht 'weight', üür 'rent', paar 'pair', topelt 'double', väärt 'valuable', tosin 'dozen', veerand 'quarter'; tund 'hour', vastlad 'shrovetide' Nautical: ankur 'anchor', kiil 'keel', tüür 'steer', praam 'pram, ferry', madrus 'sailor', pootsman 'boatswain', kotermann 'ship gremlin', loots 'pilot', kipper 'skipper' Arts: kaart 'map, card', kunst 'art', maaler 'painter', maalima 'to paint', paber 'paper', trükkima 'to print', trumm 'drum', tantsima 'to dance', piip 'pipe', vilepill 'whistle', pasun 'horn, trumpet'
Swedish loans	140	13th–17th century	kratt 'stealing demon', kroonu 'army, government', kuunar 'schooner', pagar 'baker', näkk 'mermaid, nix', plasku 'flask', plika 'girl', tasku 'pocket', räim 'herring', tünder 'barrel', moor 'old woman', puldan, tont 'ghost, demon'
Russian loans	350	14th–20th century	kapsas, tatar, puravik, riisikas, sihvka, kiisu, suslik, kulu, prussakas, tarakan, naarits, soobel, uss; noos, moiva, vobla, mutt; kamorka, putka, sara, lobudik, trahter, koiku, nari, pruss, tökat; hõlst, kamass, kirsa, kombinesoon, kott, puhvaika, marli, pintsak, retuusid, trussikud; kiisel, pontšik, rosolje, rupskid, borš, uhhaa, morss, samagon; batoon, kissell, plombiir, povidlo, šašlõkk, uhhaa; plotski, mahorka, pabeross; mannerg, kopsik; nuut, kantsik, piits, tupik, relss, jaam; kabi, knopka; kasakas, kasarmu, karauul, katelok, kiiver, munder, nekrut, pagun, polk, ranits, sinel, tentsik, utsitama, timukas, rajoon, türm, pops, artell; palakas, haltuura, parseldama, parisnik, siva, tolk, tots, pujään, kitt, tuur, ladna, prosta, sutike; kaanima, kostitama, kruttima, kupeldama
(High) German loans	500	16th–20th century	larhv, lokk, seitel; kastan, pappel, kirss, jasmiin, jorjen, kartul, tulp, vihk; ahv, auster, kalkun, siisike, miisu, mops, taks, kits, vau, viidikas, nepp, pistrik; klimp, klops, kotlet, kompvek, supp, tort, viiner, soust, vahvel, vürts, vein; jope, kittel, kampsun, kleit, vest, lips, värvel, sall, pluus; kamin, pliit, käär(kamber), sahver, latter, kabel, palat; pult, sohva, leen, kummut, kardin, sahtel; uur, klade, klamber, latern, sihverplaat, silt; opman, oober, tisler, tudeng, velsker, virtin, antvärk, aadlik, kärner, kilter, kutsar, lärm, oksjon, krempel, klatš; krehvtine, hull, liiderlik, napp, noobel, ontlik, plass, tumm, trammis; kleepima, klantsima, mehkeldama, sehkendama, rehkendama, trimpama, pummeldama, praalima, turnima; ahoi, proosit, hurraa, hopp, hallo
Finnish loans	90	19th–20th century	aare, sangar, harras, jenka, julm, jäik, sünge, tehas, uljas, vaist, vihjama, säilima, kuvama, haihtuma, anastama
Hebrew loans	< 5		jaana(lind) 'ostrich', tohuvabohu 'chaos'
Romani loans	< 5		manguma 'to beg'

=== Other ===
Proposed origin	No. of word roots	Examples
Estonian, unknown and nonsense	appr. 1000	räni 'silicium', roie 'rib', salk 'bunch', videvik 'twilight', jäärak 'gorge, valley', ila 'saliva', aas 'meadow', lubi 'lime', lõhn 'smell', kaan 'leech', kesv 'barley', ürp 'cloak', hiili- 'to sneak', mahe 'sweet, gentle', mõru 'bitter', raip 'carrion', roni- 'to climb' + numerous onomatopoetic-descriptive words
Onomatopeia	[icon]	
Artificial	50–60	veenma 'to persuade, convince', roim 'crime' (probably derived from the English 'crime'), laip 'dead body, corpse' (probably derived from the German 'Leib'), kolp 'scull', relv 'weapon, arm', ese 'thing', süüme 'conscience; scruple', mõrv 'murder' (probably derived from the German 'Mord'), ulm 'dream', siiras 'sincere, candid', range 'rigorous, stern, severe, austere, strict, inexorable, relentless' (? German 'streng', Swedish 'sträng'), sulnis 'sweet, meek, mild', nõme 'silly', taunima 'to disapprove, deprecate, deplore', naasma 'to return', reetma 'to betray' (probably from the German '(ver)raten'), embama 'to embrace'; eirama 'to ignore', eramu 'private house', etlema 'to perform', kõlar 'loudspeaker', külmik 'refrigerator', meede 'measure', meene 'souvenir', siirdama 'to transplant', teave 'information', teismeline 'teenager', üllitis 'publication', ärandama, levima, süva(muusika), taies 'piece of art', rula 'skateboard'
