= Meshchera people =

Finno-Ugric tribe

The Meschera are represented by dark green.

The Meshchera or Meshchyora (Russian: мещера or мещёра) were a Finno-Ugric tribe in the Volga region between the Oka River and the Klyazma river, today called the Meshchera Lowlands, who assimilated with the neighbouring tribes around the 16th century.

== History ==
The first Russian written source which mentions them is the Tolkovaya Paleya, from the 13th century. They are also mentioned in several later Russian chronicles from the period before the 16th century. This is in stark contrast to the related tribes Merya and Muroma, which appear to have been assimilated by the East Slavs by the 10th and the 11th centuries.

Ivan II, prince of Moscow, wrote in his will, 1358, about the village Meshcherka, which he had bought from the native Meshcherian chieftain Alexander Ukovich. The village appears to have been converted to the Christian Orthodox faith and to have been a vassal of Muscovy.

Several documents mention the Meshchera concerning the Kazan campaign by Ivan the Terrible in the 16th century. These accounts concern a state of Meshchera (known under a tentative name of Temnikov Meshchera, after its central town of Temnikov) which had been assimilated by the Mordvins and the Tatars.

Prince A. M. Kurbsky wrote that a Mordvin language was spoken in the lands of the Meshchera. The Meshchera language is unattested, and theories on its affiliation remain speculative.

In the Oka River valley, the Meshchera culture appears to have disappeared by the 11th century. In the marshy north, they appear to have stayed and to have been converted into the Orthodox faith. The Meshchera nobility appears to have been converted and assimilated by the 13th century, but the common Meshchera huntsman and fisherman may have kept elements of their language and beliefs for a longer period. In the 16th century, the St Nicholas monastery was founded in Radovitsy in order to convert the remaining Meshchera pagans. The princely family Mestchersky in Russia derives its nobility from having originally been native rulers of some of these Finnic tribes.

== Archaeology ==
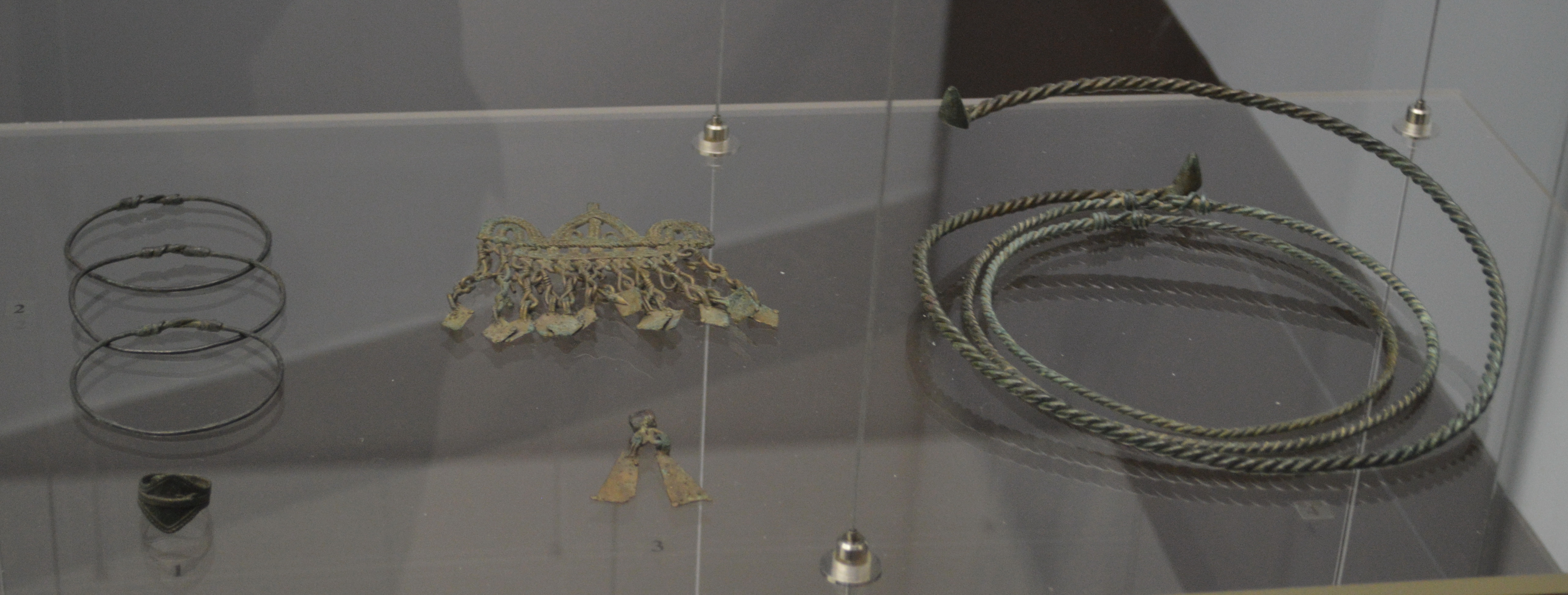
Meshchera jewellery. 9-11th century.

In the village of Zhabki (Egorievsk district, Moscow Oblast), Meshchera burial sites were found in 1870. Women's bronze decorations identified as Finno-Ugric were found and dated to the 5th-8th centuries. Very similar finds soon appeared in the Ryazan Oblast and the Vladimir Oblast, enabling archaeologists to establish what characterized the material culture of the Meshchera. 12 such sites were found from the Moskva River, along the Oka River to the town Kasimov. The general opinion is nowadays, that the Oka-Ryazan culture is identical to that of the Meshchera.

The graves of women have yielded objects typical of the Volga Finns, of the 4th-7th centuries, consisting of rings, jingling pendants, buckles and torcs. A specific feature was round breast plates with a characteristic ornamentation.

Some of the graves contained well-preserved copper oxides of the decorations with long black hair locked into small bells into which were woven pendants.

It appears from the remains that Slavic tribes arrived into Meshcheran territories in the period of the 10th-12th centuries.

== Disappearance ==
In the Oka river valley, the Meshchera culture appears to have disappeared by the 11th century. There are no indications of genocide, but the fast changes appear to show that the Meshchera were partially pushed away by the Slavs.

In the marshy north, they appear to have stayed and to have been converted into the Orthodox faith. The Slavs were not as interested in the wetlands and allowed the Meshchera to stay for some time. The Meshchera nobility appears to have been converted and assimilated by the 13th century, but the common Meshchera huntsman and fisherman may have kept elements of their language and beliefs for a longer period. In the 16th century, the St Nicholas monastery was founded in Radovitsky in order to convert the remaining Meshchera pagans. It is possible that they still spoke their old language.

The princely family Meschersky in Russia derives its nobility from having originally been native rulers of some of these Finnic tribes.

== Remaining ethnic influence ==
Ethnographers treat the modern Meshchera as a local group within the Russian ethnos. These Russian-speakers live in the massive forests on the frontier between the Moscow, Ryazan and Vladimir Oblasts. Some Meshchera also appear in the regions of Tambov, Penza and Saratov Oblasts. They are generally dark and of medium height and they continue to live as fishermen, bee-keepers and huntsmen.

It is believed that the Mishars, a subgroup of the Tatars, inherited the name Meshchera, but it remains unclear whether the ethnonym derives from the name of the region in which the group originally lived or actually indicates that the group traces its descent from the original Finno-Ugric tribe.

== Culture ==
The Meschera were primarily fishermen, beekeepers, hunters and bronze craftsmen. They knew of agriculture, but they only used it in limited amounts. Prior to assimilation from the Russians, they held to animistic beliefs.

== Language ==
Some linguists think that Meschera might have been a dialect of Mordvinic, while Pauli Rahkonen has suggested on the basis of toponymic evidence that it was a Permic or closely related language. Rahkonen's speculation has been criticized by the Russian Uralist Vladimir Napolskikh.

Some toponyms which Rahkonen suggested as Permic are the hydronymic stems: un-, ič-, vil- and ul-, which can be compared to Udmurt uno 'big', ič́i 'little', vi̮l 'upper' and ulo 'lower'. Rahkonen also theorized the name Meshchera itself could be a Permic word, and its cognate be Komi möśör 'isthmus'.

== See also ==
- Meryans
- Volga Finns
- Muromians
