= Merya language =

Extinct Finno-Ugric language

Merya
- Meryanic
- (unattested)
- Native to: Russia
- Region: Upper Volga
- Ethnicity: Meryans
- Extinct: at latest 18th century
- Revival: 2000s (reconstructed)
- Language family: Uralic: Finnic?/Mari?; Merya

Language codes
- ISO 639-3: None (mis)
- Linguist List: 0tw
- Merya

Merya or Meryanic (Old East Slavic: мєр(ь)скъıї) is an extinct Finno-Ugric language, which was spoken by the Meryans. Merya began to be assimilated by East Slavs when their territory became incorporated into Kievan Rus' in the 10th century. However some Merya speakers might have even lived in the 18th century. There is also a theory that the word for "Moscow" originates from the Merya language. The Meryan language stretched to the western parts of Vologda Oblast and Moscow.

== Classification ==
There is no general agreement on the relationship of Merya to its neighboring Uralic languages.

- A traditional account places Merya as a member of the Volga-Finnic group, comprising also the Mordvinic and Mari languages. However, Volga Finnic is today considered obsolete.
- T. Semenov and Max Vasmer believed Merya to be a close relative of Mari. Vasmer saw that many Merya toponyms have Mari parallels.
- One hypothesis classifies the Merya as a western branch of the Mari people rather than as a separate tribe. Their ethnonyms are basically identical, Merya being a Russian transcription of the Mari self-designation, Мäрӹ (Märӛ). According to Stepan Kuznetsov, the ethnonym Merya in toponyms becomes Mari moving to the east.
- Eugene Helimski supposed that the Merya language was part of a "northwest" group of Finno-Ugric, including also Balto-Finnic and Sami. Helimski argued that even though there are Mari parallels, they do not justify a close relationship with Mari and could be due to adjacency of the language areas.
- Gábor Bereczki supposed that the Merya language was a part of the Balto-Finnic group.
- Mordvinian author Aleksandr Sharonov claimed that Merya is an Erzyan dialect; however this is not well supported.

Rahkonen (2013) argues that the likewise unattested and unclassified-within-Uralic Muromian language was a close relative of Merya, perhaps even a dialect of Meryan.

A probable characteristic of the Merya language, noted by some researchers, is the plural -k, as in Hungarian, while most Uralic languages use -t to mark the plural.

== Phonology ==
Meryan phonology has been studied only in general terms, with analyses relying on Russian dialects in the Kostroma and Yaroslavl regions. Helimski suggests that Merya likely developed massive reduction of word-final syllables. The Merya language only allowed one consonant at the beginning of words, and likely placed stress on the first syllable of a word. It likely did not feature vowel harmony. The vowels /ö/, /ä/ and /y/ likely existed in the Merya language.

== Reconstruction ==
Reconstructed Merya
- мерян елма merjan jelma
- Created by: various
- Date: 1985
- Ethnicity: Meryan ethnofuturists
- Purpose: Constructed language: Reconstructed Merya
- Sources: Merya (toponyms), Mari, Veps

Language codes
- ISO 639-3: None (mis)
- Glottolog: None

There have been attempts to re-construct Merya based on toponyms, onomastics and words in Russian dialects by O. B. Tkachenko, Arja Ahlqvist and A. K. Matveev among others. The first reconstructions were done in 1985 by O. B. Tkachenko. The latest book about Merya reconstructions was published in 2019. As an example: in Russian toponyms from areas where Merya was spoken, an ending -яхр (-jaxr) is regularly seen in names relating to lakes. This also resembles, but does not exactly match, the words for 'lake' in western Uralic languages, such as Finnish järvi, Northern Sami jávri, Erzya эрьке (eŕke), Meadow Mari ер (jer) (from a common proto-form *jäwrä). From these it can be inferred that -яхр likely continues the Meryan word for 'lake', which may have had a form such as *jäkrä, *jähr(e)

According to Rahkonen, in Merya areas there is a word *veks, which is probably cognate with the Komi word вис (vis) 'middle river', and similar also to an element vieksi which appears in Finnish toponyms. From Merya toponyms it can also be seen that words such as volo 'down' (Finnish: ala), vondo 'give' (Finnish: antaa) existed in the Merya language. From this it can be concluded that Finnish a- corresponds to *vo- or *o- in the Merya language. Another thing that can be observed is the Finnish sound "a" corresponding to a Merya "o", for example a hydronym kol(o) can be seen, which can be compared to Finnish kala 'fish'. In the Muroma-Merya territory a word il(e) can be observed, which can be compared to Finnic *ülä ‘upper’.

== See also ==
- Volga Finns
- Mari language
- Meryan ethnofuturism
