= Proto-Uralic language =

Ancestor of the Uralic languages

Proto-Uralic
- (may be equivalent to Proto-Finno-Ugric)
- Reconstruction of: Uralic languages
- Region: See Proto-Uralic homeland
- Era: 2500-2000 BCE (recent consensus)
- Lower-order reconstructions: Proto-Sámi; Proto-Finnic; Proto-Hungarian; Proto-Samoyedic

Proto-Uralic is the unattested reconstructed language ancestral to the modern Uralic language family. The reconstructed language is thought to have been originally spoken in a small area, and then expanded across northern Eurasia, gradually diverging into a dialect continuum and then a language family in the process. The location of the area or Urheimat is not known, and various strongly differing proposals have been put forward, but the vicinity of the Ural Mountains is generally viewed as the most likely.

== Early descendants ==
According to the traditional binary tree model, Proto-Uralic diverged into Proto-Samoyedic and Proto-Finno-Ugric. However, reconstructed Proto-Finno-Ugric differs little from Proto-Uralic, and many apparent differences follow from the methods used. Thus, Proto-Finno-Ugric may not be separate from Proto-Uralic. Another reconstruction of the split of Proto-Uralic has three branches (Finno-Permic, Ugric and Samoyedic) from the start.

=== "Comb" model ===
In the early 21st century, these tree-like models have been challenged by the hypothesis of larger number of proto-languages giving an image of a linguistic "comb" rather than a tree. Thus, the second-order groups of the Uralic phylum would then be: Sami, Finnic, Mordvinic, Mari, Permic, Hungarian, Mansi, Khanty and Samoyedic, all on equal footing. This order is both the order of geographical positions as well as linguistic similarity, with neighboring languages being more similar than distant ones.

== Phonology ==
Similarly to the situation for Proto-Indo-European, reconstructions of Proto-Uralic are traditionally not written in IPA but in UPA.

=== Vowels ===
Proto-Uralic had vowel harmony and a rather large inventory of vowels in initial syllables, much like the modern Hungarian, Finnish or Estonian system:

| | Front | | Back | |
| | Unrounded | Rounded | Unrounded | Rounded |
|---|---|---|---|---|
| Close | i /i/ | ü /y/ | i̮ /ɯ/ | u /u/ |
| Mid | e /e/ | | | o /o/ |
| Open | ä /æ/ | | a /ɑ/ | |

Sometimes a mid vowel *e̮ /ɤ/ is reconstructed in place of *i̮, or a low back rounded *å /ɒ/ in place of *a.

There were no monophonemic long vowels nor diphthongs, though sequences of vowel and semivowel within a single syllable (such as *äj) could exist.

==== Unstressed vowels ====
Vowel inventory in non-initial syllables was restricted: only a two-way contrast of open and non-open vowels is incontestably reconstructible. The actual realization of this contrast is a question of debate: one view considers this two archiphonemic vowels ⫽a⫽ and ⫽i⫽, realized as four allophones [æ ɑ], [i ɯ] as per vowel harmony. However, other scholars such as Zhivlov posit the existence of disharmonic *i-a stems in Proto-Uralic, which would imply that vowel harmony was not allophonic.

For the non-open vowel(s), most branches reflect a reduced vowel [ə], however:

- The Finnic languages show /e/ or /ɤ/ depending on harmony, word-finally /i/.
- The Samic languages show a variety of reflexes, but these reflexes can be traced back to a Proto-Samic phoneme *e̮, which is also the reflex of Proto-Uralic *i and *ü in stressed syllables.

While vowel reduction is a common sound change, Finnic is known to have adstrate influence from language groups that would not have known reduced vowels (namely the Baltic languages and the early Germanic languages), so a value of [ə] already in Proto-Uralic remains a possibility.

Although these three or four stem types were certainly the most prominent ones in Proto-Uralic, it is possible that other, rarer types may have existed as well. These include for example kinship terms such as "sister-in-law", found as *kälü in both Proto-Finnic and Proto-Samoyedic. Janhunen (1981) and Sammallahti (1988) reconstruct here instead a word-final labial glide: *käliw.

A general difficulty in reconstructing unstressed vowels for Proto-Uralic lies in their heavy reduction and loss in many of the Uralic languages. Especially in the Ugric and Permic languages, almost no trace of unstressed vowels appears in basic word roots. The original bisyllabic root structure has been well preserved in only the more peripheral groups: Samic and Finnic in the northwest, Samoyedic in the east. The main correspondences of unstressed vowels between these are as follows:

Reflexes of Proto-Uralic unstressed vowels
| Proto-Uralic | Proto-Samic | Proto-Finnic | Proto-Samoyedic | Notes |
|---|---|---|---|---|
| *-a | *-ē [eː] | *-a [ɑ] | *-å [ɒ] | |
| *-ä | *-ē [eː] | *-ä [æ] | *-ä [æ] | |
| *-i | *-e̮ [ɤ] | *-e | ∅ | after original open syllables |
| *-i | *-e̮ [ɤ] | *-e | *-ə | after original closed syllables |

Developments in Mordvinic and Mari are rather more complicated. In the former, Proto-Uralic *-a and *-ä are usually reduced to *-ə; *-a is however regularly retained whenever the first syllable of the word contained *u. Proto-Uralic *-i is regularly lost after open syllables, as well as in some other positions.

==== Conditional vowel shifts ====
A number of roots appear to diverge from the main picture of unstressed syllables in a different way: while Finnic, Samic and Samoyedic languages all have one of the "typical" stem shapes, they may not quite match. Words in these classes often feature discrepancies in the vowels of the first syllable as well, e.g. Finnic *a or *oo (suggesting Proto-Uralic *a or *i̮) against Samic *ā (suggesting Proto-Uralic *ä) or *oa (suggesting Proto-Uralic *o).

A number of such cases may result simply from conditional vowel shifts in unstressed syllables. In fact, multiple vowel shifts are reconstructed in branches of Uralic sensitive to a particular combination of stem vowel and following reduced vowel, in which both change at once. A shift *a-i > *o-a can be posited for Samic as well as the Mordvinic languages. E.g.:

*a-i > *o-a in Samic and Mordvinic
| Proto-Samic | Mordvinic | Proto-Finnic | Proto-Samoyedic | Hungarian | other reflexes | meaning |
|---|---|---|---|---|---|---|
| *čoarvē < *ćorwa | Erzya сюро /sʲuro/ Moksha сюра /sʲura/ < *śorwa- | *sarvi | - | szarv | | 'horn' |
| *čoalē < *ćola | Erzya сюло /sʲulo/ Moksha сюла /sʲula/ < *śola- | *sooli < *sali | - | | | 'intestine' |
| *koalō- < *kola(w)- | Erzya куло- /kulo-/ Moksha куло- /kulə-/ < *kola- | *koole- < *kali- | *kåə- | hal | | 'to die' |
| *koamtē < *komta | Erzya and Moksha кунда /kunda/ < *komta | *kanci < *kanti | - | kendő | Mari комдыш /komdəʃ/ | 'lid' |

The change is, however, masked by the shift of *i̮ to *a (which later develops to Proto-Samic *uo) in words such as:

Non-raising of *i̮-i in Samic and Mordvinic
| Proto-Samic | Mordvinic | Proto-Finnic | Proto-Samoyedic | Hungarian | other reflexes | meaning |
|---|---|---|---|---|---|---|
| *ńuole̮ < *ńali | Erzya, Moksha нал /nal/ | *nooli < *nali | *ńe̮l | nyíl | | 'arrow' |
| *suone̮ < *sani | Erzya, Moksha сан /san/ | *sooni < *sani | *ce̮n | ín | | 'vein, sinew' |
| *ϑuome̮ < *δami | Erzya лём /lʲom/ Moksha лайме /lajmɛ/ | *toomi < *tami | *je̮m | - | | 'bird cherry' |
| *vuopte̮ < *apti | - | *(h)apci < *apti | *e̮pti | - | | 'hair' |

In a second group, a change *ä-ä > *a-e appears to have taken place in Finnic in words such as:

*ä-ä > *a-e in Finnic
| Proto-Finnic | Proto-Samic | Proto-Samoyedic | Hungarian | other reflexes | meaning |
|---|---|---|---|---|---|
| *loomi < *lami | - | - | - | Erzya леме /lʲeme/ | 'scab' |
| *pooli < *pali | *pealē | *pälä | fél | Erzya пеле /pelʲe/ | 'half' |
| *sappi | *sāppē | - | epe | Erzya сэпе /sepe/ | 'gall' |
| *talvi | *tālvē | - | tél | Erzya теле /tʲelʲe/ | 'winter' |
| *vaski | *veaškē | *wäsa | vas | Mari -вож /βoʒ/ 'ore' | 'copper, bronze' ~ 'iron' |

=== Consonants ===
In the consonant system, palatalization, or palatal-laminal instead of apical articulation, was a phonemic feature, as it is in many modern Uralic languages. Only one series of stops (unvoiced unaspirated) existed:

| | Bilabial | Dental | Palatal(ized) | Retroflex | Velar | unknown |
|---|---|---|---|---|---|---|
| Plosive and Affricate | p /p/ | t /t/ | (ć /t͡sʲ ~ t͡ɕ/) | č /t̠͡ʂ/ | k /k/ | |
| Nasal | m /m/ | n /n/ | ń /nʲ ~ ɲ/ | | ŋ /ŋ/ | |
| Sibilant | | s /s/ | ś /sʲ ~ ɕ/ | (š /ʂ/) | | |
| Spirants | | δ /ð/ | δ´ /ðʲ/ | | | |
| Lateral | | l /l/ | (ľ /lʲ ~ ʎ/) | | | |
| Trill | | r /r/ | | | | |
| Semivowel | w /w/ | | j /j/ | | | |
| unknown | | | | | | /x/? |

The segments symbolized by č and š were likely retroflex. The phonetic nature of the segment symbolized by *x is uncertain, though it is usually considered a back consonant; [x], [ɣ], [ɡ], and [h] have been suggested among others. Janhunen (1981, 2007) takes no explicit stance, leaving open the option for even a vocalic value. It is reconstructed by certain scholars in syllable-final position in word-stems where a contrastive long vowel later developed (similar to Turkish ğ), best preserved in the Finnic languages, and where Samoyedic features a vowel sequence such as *åə. The correlation between these two stem classes is however not perfect, and alternate possibilities exist for explaining both vowel length in Finnic and vowel sequences in Samoyedic. *x is also reconstructed word-medially, and in this position it also develops to a Finnic long vowel, but has clear consonantal reflexes elsewhere: *k in Samic, *j in Mordvinic and *ɣ in Ugric. If a consonant, it probably derives from lenition of *k at a pre-Uralic stage; it is only found in words ending in a non-open vowel, while *k is infrequent or nonexistent in similar positions.

The phonetic identity of the consonant *δ´ is also subject to some doubt. It is traditionally analyzed as the palatalized counterpart of the voiced dental fricative *δ, that is, as [ðʲ]; however, this a typologically rare sound value for which no direct evidence is found in any Uralic language, and a pure palatal fricative [ʝ] is another option; a third option is a palatal liquid like, e. g., Czech ř. Some others propose to adjust the sound values of both this consonant and its plain counterpart. Ugricist László Honti has advanced a reconstruction with lateral fricatives: [ɬ], [ɬʲ] for *δ, *δ´, while Frederik Kortlandt reconstructs palatalized [rʲ] and [lʲ], alleging that they pattern like resonants.

==== Dubious segments ====
The phonemes in parentheses—*ć, *š, *ĺ—are supported by only limited evidence, and are not assumed by all scholars. Sammallahti (1988) notes that while instances of *ć are found in all three of Permic, Hungarian and Ob-Ugric, there are "very few satisfactory etymologies" showing any correlation between the branches in whether *ć or *ś appears. In the other languages, no consistent distinction between these consonants is found.

The evidence for the postalveolar sibilant *š however is "scarce but probably conclusive" (ibid): it is treated distinctly from *s only in the more western (Finno-Permic) languages, but certain loans from as far back as the Proto-Indo-European language have reflexes traceable to a postalveolar fricative (including *piši- or *peši- "to cook"). The possibility of *ĺ is not considered by him at all.

In contrast, Janhunen, who considers Samoyedic evidence necessary for conclusions about Proto-Uralic, doubts that *š can be reconstructed, preferring to consider it a secondary, post-Proto-Uralic innovation (p. 210). He agrees with Sammallahti in omitting *ĺ and in only considering a single palatal obstruent as necessary to reconstruct; for the latter he suggests the sound value of a palatal stop, [c] (p. 211).

More recently, reflexes of Proto-Uralic *š have been found in Samoyedic, e.g. PU *kajšaw > Proto-Samoyedic *kåjtåw.

=== Phonotactics ===
No final consonant clusters were allowed, so words could end with a maximum of one consonant only. The single consonants *δ *x *ŋ *r also could not occur word-initially, though at least for the first of these, this may be a coincidental omission in the data. A reconstruction *δäpδä "spleen" exists but is not found in Samoyedic and the most stringent criteria for a Proto-Uralic root thus excludes it. A similar case is *repä "fox", a loanword from Indo-Iranian.

Inside word roots, only clusters of two consonants were permitted. Since *j and *w were consonants even between a vowel and another consonant, there were no sequences of a "diphthong" followed by two consonants, like in Finnish veitsi. While voicing was not a phonemic feature, double (i.e. geminate) stops probably existed (*i̮ppi "father-in-law", *witti "five", *lükkä- "to push"). The singleton–geminate contrast in several descendant languages developed into a voiced–voiceless distinction, although Finnic is a notable exception, e.g. Finnish appi, lykkää.

When, due to suffixation, consonant clusters arose that were not permitted, the non-low vowel was inserted as a prop vowel. This process was obscured in the Finnic languages by an opposing process which syncopated unstressed *e in many cases.

=== Prosody ===
Proto-Uralic did not have contrastive tone. The majority view considers stress to have been fixed on the first syllable, although this is not universally accepted.

=== Phonological processes ===
Consonant gradation may have occurred already in Proto-Uralic: if it did, it was probably an allophonic alternation involving voicing of the stop consonants: [p ~ b], [t ~ d], [k ~ ɡ].

== Grammar ==
Grammatically, Proto-Uralic was an agglutinative nominative–accusative language.

=== Nouns ===
Proto-Uralic nouns are reconstructed with at least six noun cases and three numbers, singular, dual and plural. However, the dual number has been lost in many of the contemporary Uralic languages. Grammatical gender is absent in reconstructions given that no Uralic language has ever been attested to have gender systems. Definite or indefinite articles are not reconstructed either.

The plural marker of nouns was *-t in final position and *-j- in non-final position, as seen in Finnish talot and talojen ("house" nom. pl. and gen. pl.). The dual marker has been reconstructed as *-k-.

The reconstructed cases are:

- nominative (no suffix)
- accusative *-m
- genitive *-n
- locative *-na / *-nä
- ablative *-ta / *-tä
- lative *-ŋ

The cases had only one three-way locative contrast of entering, residing and exiting (lative, locative and ablative respectively). This is the origin of the three-way systems as the three different ones in Karelian Finnish (illative/inessive/elative, allative/adessive/ablative, translative/essive/exessive). The partitive case, developed from the ablative, was a later innovation in the Finnic and Samic languages. Further cases are occasionally mentioned, e.g. Robert Austerlitz's reconstruction of Proto-Finno-Ugric includes a seventh, adverbial.

A further noun case likely already found in Proto-Uralic is the translative *-ksi. The abessive *-ktak / *-ktäk is not completely certain as it could also have been a derivational category rather than a noun case. So as many as seven or eight noun cases can be reconstructed for Proto-Uralic with high plausibility.

The nouns also had possessive suffixes, one for each combination of number and person. These took the place of possessive pronouns, which did not exist.

=== Verbs ===
Verbs were conjugated at least according to number, person and tense. The reconstructions of mood markers are controversial. Some scholars argue that there were separate subjective and objective conjugations, but this is disputed; clear reflexes of the objective conjugation are found in only the easternmost branches, and hence it may also represent an areal innovation. Negation was expressed with the means of a negative verb *e-, found as such in e.g. Finnish e+mme "we don't".

==== Ergativity hypothesis ====
Merlijn De Smit of Stockholm University has argued for ergativity in Proto-Uralic, reinterpreting the accusative case as a lative one and arguing for a marked subject via the genitive case and a verbal ending, *mV-. Support for this theory comes from the Finnish agent participle constructions, e.g. miehen ajama auto — car driven by the man, Naisen leipoma kakku — the cake that woman baked. In these constructions the subject, which is usually unmarked, is in the genitive case, while the direct object, usually marked with -n is unmarked.

This construction also occurs in Udmurt, Mari, Mordvinic (the -mV participle is absent), and Karelian. However, unlike Finnish, the construction is also used with intransitive sentences, characterized by the same -mV suffix on the verb, e.g. Udmurt gyrem busy, "a ploughed field, a field that has been ploughed", lyktem kišnomurt, "the arrived lady, the lady who has arrived". The -mV participle ending in Mari denotes a preterite passive meaning, e.g. in Eastern Mari omsam počmo, "the door (has been) opened", təj kaləkən mondəmo ulat, "you are forgotten by the people", and memnan tolmo korno, "the road that we have come".

This is problematic for the ergative theory because the -mV participle, labelled the ergative marker, is a passive marker in most of the languages that use it, and the Finnish agent participle constructions may in fact derive from similar constructions in Baltic languages, e.g. Lithuanian tėvo perkamas automobilis or automobilis (yra) tėvo perkamas. Notable is the unmistakable resemblance between the Baltic and Finnic verbal suffixes, and the fact that -mV is missing in both Estonian and Mordvinic, despite being two very close relatives of Finnish. However, the Baltic participle in -ma does not represent the most common Indo-European ending of a passive participle, even though it does have parallels in other Indo-European languages. Even if the ending derives from Proto-Uralic and not the Baltic languages, the transition from a passive to ergative construction is very common and has been observed in Indo-Aryan, Salish, and Polynesian. The transition begins when the unmarked subject of the passive sentence, usually marked in active sentences (if the language is inflectional), is re-analyzed as an unmarked absolutive, and the marked agent as ergative.

== Syntax ==
Proto-Uralic was an SOV language with postpositions and without finite subordination.

== Vocabulary ==
Approximately 500 Uralic lemmas can be reconstructed. However, not all of them contain reflexes in every Uralic branch, particularly the Samoyedic branch.

The reconstructed vocabulary is compatible with a Mesolithic hunter-gatherer culture and a north Eurasian landscape (spruce, Siberian pine, and various other species found in the Siberian taiga), and contains interesting hints on kinship structure. On the other hand, agricultural terms cannot be reconstructed for Proto-Uralic. Words for ‘sheep’, ‘wheat / barley’ and ‘flour’ are phonologically irregular within Uralic and all have limited distribution. In addition, the word for ‘metal’ or ‘copper’ is actually a Wanderwort (cf. North Saami veaiki, Finnish vaski ‘copper, bronze’, Hungarian vas, and Nganasan basa ‘iron’).

Examples of vocabulary correspondences between the modern Uralic languages are provided in the list of comparisons at the Finnish Wikipedia.

=== Plants ===
Tree names

- *kowsi ‘spruce’
- *ďi̮mi ‘bird-cherry’
- *si̮ksa ‘Siberian pine, Pinus sibirica’

Additional selected plant names from the Uralic Etymological Database:

| scientific name | common name | proto-form | proto-language | no. |
|---|---|---|---|---|
| Picea abies | spruce, fir | *kawse, *kaxse | Proto-Uralic | 429 |
| Rubus chamaemorus | cloudberry, cranberry, knotberry | *mura | Proto-Uralic | 564 |
| Populus tremula | aspen | *pojɜ | Proto-Uralic | 787 |
| Pinus cembra | Siberian pine | *soksɜ (*saksɜ), *se̮ksɜ | Proto-Uralic | 903 |
| Larix sibirica | larch | *näŋɜ | Proto-Finno-Ugric | 591 |
| Amanita muscaria | fly agaric | *paŋka | Proto-Finno-Ugric | 706 |
| Ledum palustre | wild rosemary | *woĺɜ | Proto-Finno-Ugric | 1163 |
| Ribes nigrum | black currant | *ćɜkčɜ(-kkɜ) | Proto-Finno-Ugric | 83 |
| Lonicera xylosteum | honeysuckle | *kusa | Proto-Finno-Permic | 1346 |
| Ulmus | elm | *ńolkɜ, *ńalkɜ | Proto-Finno-Permic | 1446 |
| Pinus sylvestris | Scots pine | *pe(n)čä | Proto-Finno-Permic | 1475 |
| Viburnum opulus, Acer campestre | snowball tree, field maple | *šewɜ | Proto-Finno-Permic | 1612 |
| Populus tremula | aspen | *šapa | Proto-Finno-Volgaic | 1609 |
| Ribes | currant | *ćɜkčɜ-tɜrɜ | Proto-Finno-Volgaic | 1209 |
| Acer platanoides | maple | *wakš-tɜre (*wokštɜre) | Proto-Finno-Volgaic | 1683 |

=== Animals ===
Selected Proto-Uralic animal vocabulary:

- *kala ‘fish’
- *kuďi- ‘spawn’
- *śi̮mi ‘scales, fish skin'
- *pesä ‘nest’
- *muna ‘egg’
- *tulka ‘feather’
- *küji ‘snake’
- *täji ‘louse’

Fish species

- *särki ‘roach / ruffe’
- *säwni / *sewni ‘ide’
- *totki ‘tench’

Bird species

- *śäkśi ‘osprey’
- *śodka ‘goldeneye’
- *kurki / *ki̮rki ‘crane’
- *lunta ‘goose’
- *epik(i) ‘eagle owl’
- *ti̮ktV / *tuktV ‘black-throated loon’

Mammal species

- *ńoma(-la) ‘hare’
- *ńukiś(i) ‘marten / sable’
- *ora(-pa) ‘squirrel’
- *śijil(i) ‘hedgehog’
- *šiŋir(i) ‘mouse’

Additional selected animal names from the Uralic Etymological Database:

| scientific name | common name | proto-form | proto-language | no. |
|---|---|---|---|---|
| Salmo | a species of trout | *kȣmɜ | Proto-Uralic | 440 |
| Mustela martes | pine marten | *lujɜ | Proto-Uralic | 494 |
| Salvelinus alpinus, Salmo trutta, Hucho taimen | salmon spp. | *ńowŋa | Proto-Uralic | 642 |
| Stenodus nelma | nelma, Siberian white salmon | *ončɜ | Proto-Uralic | 669 |
| Tetrastes bonasia | hazel grouse | *piŋe (*püŋe) | Proto-Uralic | 770 |
| Mustela erminea | ermine | *pojta | Proto-Uralic | 786 |
| Tinca tinca | tench | *totke | Proto-Uralic | 1068 |
| Picus | a species of woodpecker | *kȣ̈rɜ | Proto-Finno-Ugric | 446 |
| Apis mellifera | Western honey bee | *mekše | Proto-Finno-Ugric | 534 |
| Tetrao urogallus | male of capercaillie | *paδ̕tɜ | Proto-Finno-Ugric | 688 |
| Hirundo rustica | swallow | *päćkɜ | Proto-Finno-Ugric | 711 |
| Acipenser sturio | sturgeon | *śampe | Proto-Finno-Ugric | 932 |
| Gavia arctica | black-throated diver | *tokta | Proto-Finno-Ugric | 1062 |
| Tetrao urogallus | capercaillie | *kopa-la (*koppa-la), *kopa-ľ́a (*koppa-ľ́a) | Proto-Finno-Ugric or Proto-Finno-Volgaic | 353 |
| Parus | tit | *ćȣńɜ | Proto-Finno-Permic | 1206 |

== See also ==
- Proto-Finnic language
- Proto-Uralic homeland hypotheses
