= Meshchera (disambiguation) =

Meshchera people were a Finno-Ugric tribe in the Volga region.

Meshchera or Meshchyora (Russian: Мещёра) may also refer to:

- Meshchera language
- Meshchera Lowlands
- Meshchyora National Park
