= Finno-Volgaic languages =

Subdivision of the Uralic languages

Finno-Volgaic
- (hypothetical)
- Geographic distribution: Northern Fennoscandia, Baltic states, Southwestern and Southeastern Russia
- Linguistic classification: Uralic: Finno-Ugric?; Finno-Permic?; Finno-Volgaic
- Subdivisions: Finnic languages; Sami languages; Mordvinic languages; Mari language

Language codes
- Glottolog: None
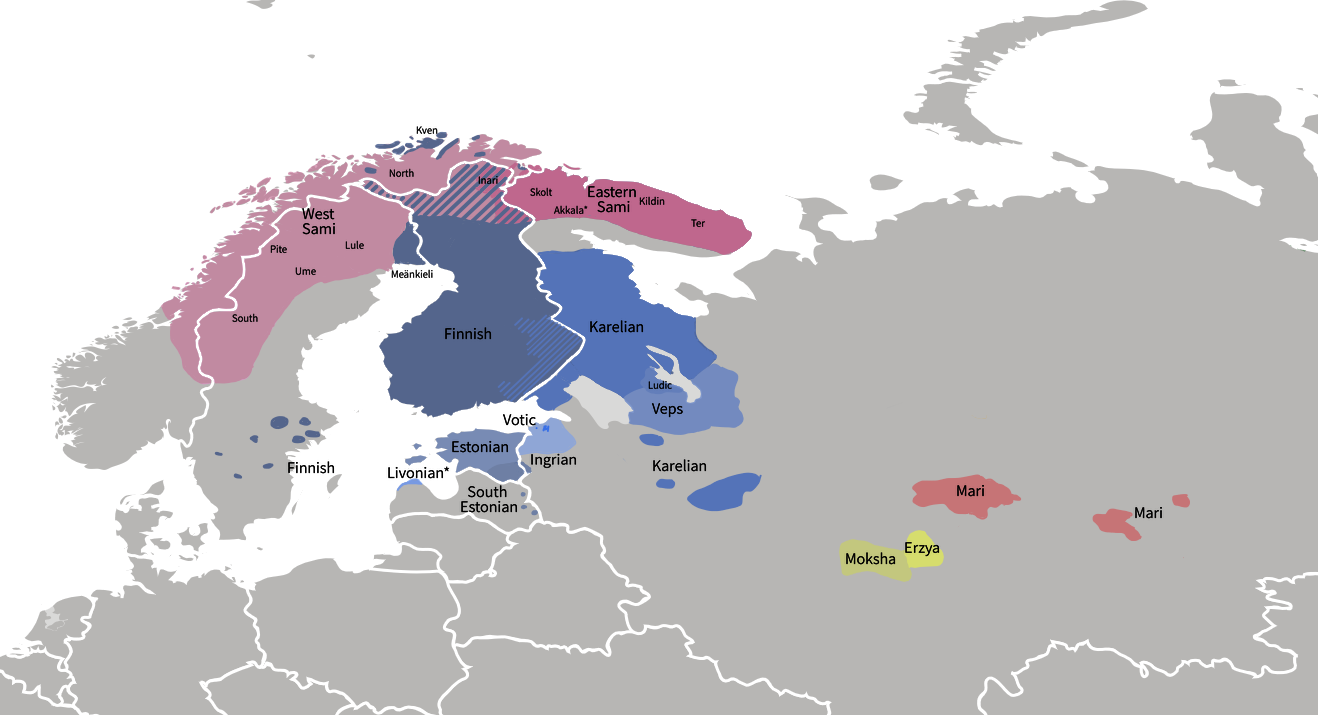
- The distribution of Finno-Volgaic languages

Finno-Volgaic or Fenno-Volgaic is a hypothetical branch of the Uralic languages that tries to group the Finnic languages, Sami languages, Mordvinic languages, and the Mari language. The hypothesis would have this language group branching from the Finno-Permic languages about 2000 BC.

The Finnic and Sami languages are sometimes grouped together as Finno-Samic languages, while Mordvinic and Mari were formerly grouped together as the obsolete group of the Volga-Finnic languages.

The current stage of research rejects Volga-Finnic, while the validity of Finno-Samic and Finno-Permic remains disputed. In particular, the position of Mari within the alleged grouping appears to be marginal, while more evidence can be found uniting specifically Finnic, Samic, and Mordvinic.

Only a single uniting phonological feature of the Finno-Volgaic languages has been proposed: the loss of the consonant *w before rounded vowels.

Lexical evidence for a Finno-Volgaic group is weak as well. Less than ten word roots are known that would be shared by all four member groups, while being absent from the other Uralic languages.

== See also ==
- Volga Finns
