= Khoisan revivalism =

Phenomenon of individuals claiming to be Khoisan

Khoisan revivalism is the phenomenon of individuals claiming to be Khoisan (descendants) and defending indigenous rights. The Khoisan revival movement aims to confirm and demarginalise the cultural identity of the Khoisan in modern-day South Africa. Khoisan revival is most active and likely to impact policy-making in Cape Town, in the Western Cape province of South Africa. The Cape Khoi are the Khoisan revivalists of the Western Cape.

== Origins and methodology ==
The growth of the Khoisan revival has been fueled by contemporary political discussions in South Africa about the potential of pre-1913 land claims and the recognition of Khoisan traditional authority. In order to support their pursuit of land claims, Khoisan revivalists emphasise ancestral kinship and question "coloured" identity. Rejecting the term Coloured as an oppressive colonialist and apartheid imposition is the foundation of the Khoisan revivalist movement. In that its adherents reject colour as the colonisers' caricature of the colonised, the Khoisan revivalist movement is fundamentally instrumentalist, due to the connection between the identity and land rights and restoration. In essence, Khoisan revivalism is both Coloured-rejectionist and exclusionist. It is rejectionist in the sense that Khoisan identity, which is rejected as the coloniser's twisted caricature of the colonized, is joyfully affirmed as an actual civilisation with a long history. It is exclusive in the sense that it introduces a new justification for a position of relative privilege, even if it does not express the claim to be the actual indigenes of South Africa. Many wonder what it means for this revivalist movement, which asserts indigeneity and First Nation status in South and Southern Africa, to do so under the title Khoisan, whose colonial and Eurocentric roots are generally known. Because they value their racial identity, most coloured people do not adhere to Khoisan revivalism, despite its expansion. Due to the historical contributions made by other demographic groups to coloured identity, many people also view assertions of Khoisan identification to be problematic.

=== Resource competition and economic background ===
Competition for socioeconomic resources or attempts to obtain resources had an impact on the Khoisan revival. Segments of coloured groups were more willing to recognise and proclaim an African heritage when a White administration was replaced in 1994 by one controlled by Bantu-speaking Africans. According to Khoisan revivalists, apartheid-era colonisation left many coloured communities in South Africa with a foundational dispossession that led to the current socio-economic problems of housing, drug usage, and organised crime. Khoisan revivalism strives to emphasise the necessity to address the continuities relating conditions before, during, and after apartheid since apartheid is not its primary focus, in order to give some existential bearings for many.

=== Private sector and organizations ===
Khoisan history and identity are revived in the private sector in a variety of ways, such as learning to speak Khoekhoegowab, a standardized Nama language, altering one's name (particularly on social media), or referring to significant persons in Khoisan history. A new method of (re)constructing contemporary Khoisan identities has been made possible by the resurgence of the Khoekhoegowab language. The rebuilding of contemporary Khoisan identities, which includes the use and development of the Khoekhoegowab language, is essential to Khoisan revivalism and is rooted in a decolonising epistemology. The Khoisan revivalist movement has given rise to organizations, such as the Khoi and San Active Awareness Group (KSAAG), whose members are teaching Khoekhoegowab. The KSAAG maintains that the Khoi and San (Bushmen) linguistic heritage should be preserved and promoted.

== See also ==
- Cherokee descent
- Ethnofuturism
- Indigenous peoples of Africa
- Indigenismo in the United States
- Meryan ethnofuturism
