= Meshchera language =

Extinct Uralic language

Meshchera
- Native to: Russia
- Region: Oka
- Ethnicity: Meshchera
- Era: 13th–16th century
- Language family: Uralic: Mordvinic?/Permic?; Meshchera

Language codes
- ISO 639-3: None (mis)
- Linguist List: 0tx
- Map of Volga Finns in the 9th century

Meshchera is an extinct Uralic language. It was spoken by the Meshchera people around the left bank of the Middle Oka. Meshchera was either a Mordvinic or a Permic language. Pauli Rahkonen has suggested on the basis of toponymic evidence that it was a Permic or closely related language, though Rahkonen's theory has been rejected by other researchers such as Vladimir Napolskikh. Some Meshchera speaking people may have assimilated into the Mishar Tatars (Meshcheryaki), though this theory is disputed.

The first Russian written source which mentions the Meshchera language is the Tolkovaya Paleya, from the 13th century. It is also mentioned in several later Russian chronicles from the period before the 16th century, and even later, in one of the letters by Andrey Kurbsky written in the second half of the 16th century, where he claimed the language spoken in the Meshchera region to be Mordvinic.

== Reconstruction ==
Some words have been reconstructed from Meshchera based on toponymic data, for example: Meshchera hydronymic stems un-, ič-, vil- and ul-, which can be compared to Udmurt uno 'big', ič́i 'little', vi̮l 'upper' and ulo 'lower'.

== See also ==
- Meryans
- Meryan language
- Volga Finns
