= Ex nihilo (disambiguation) =

Ex nihilo is a Latin phrase meaning "out of nothing" that may refer to:

- Creatio ex nihilo, the belief that matter is not eternal, but had to be divinely created
- Ex nihilo nihil fit, Latin for the philosophical dictum "nothing comes from nothing"
- Ex nihilo lexical enrichment, adding of new words deriving from nonsense instead of a pre-existing word
- Ex Nihilo (character), a fictional character
- Ex Nihilo (magazine), former name of a creationist magazine
- Ex Nihilo (sculpture), a sculpture by Frederick Hart
- Agat Films & Cie – Ex Nihilo, a French film production and distribution company
