= Imenkovo culture =

Early medieval culture of the Middle Volga region

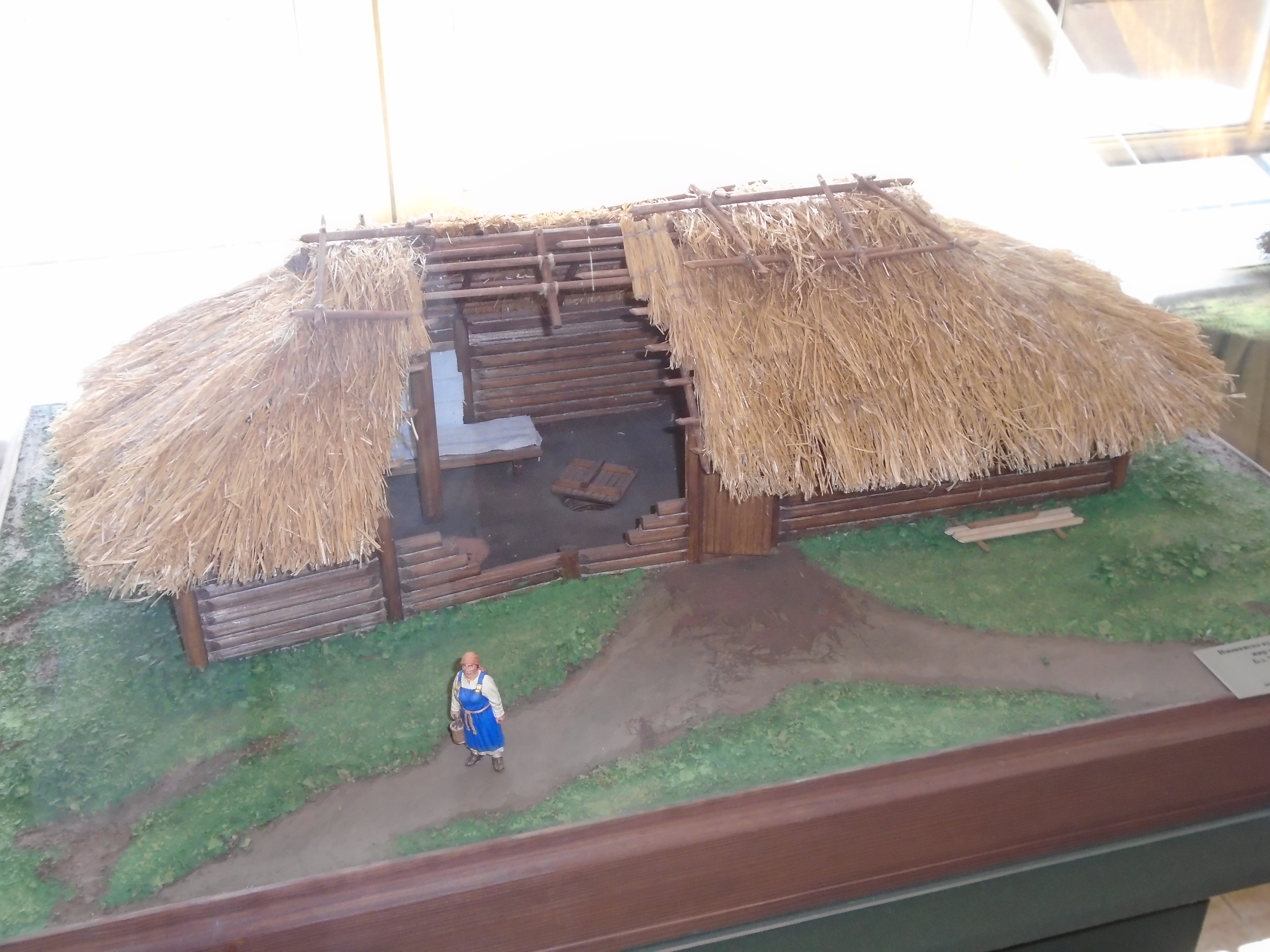
A reconstructed dwelling

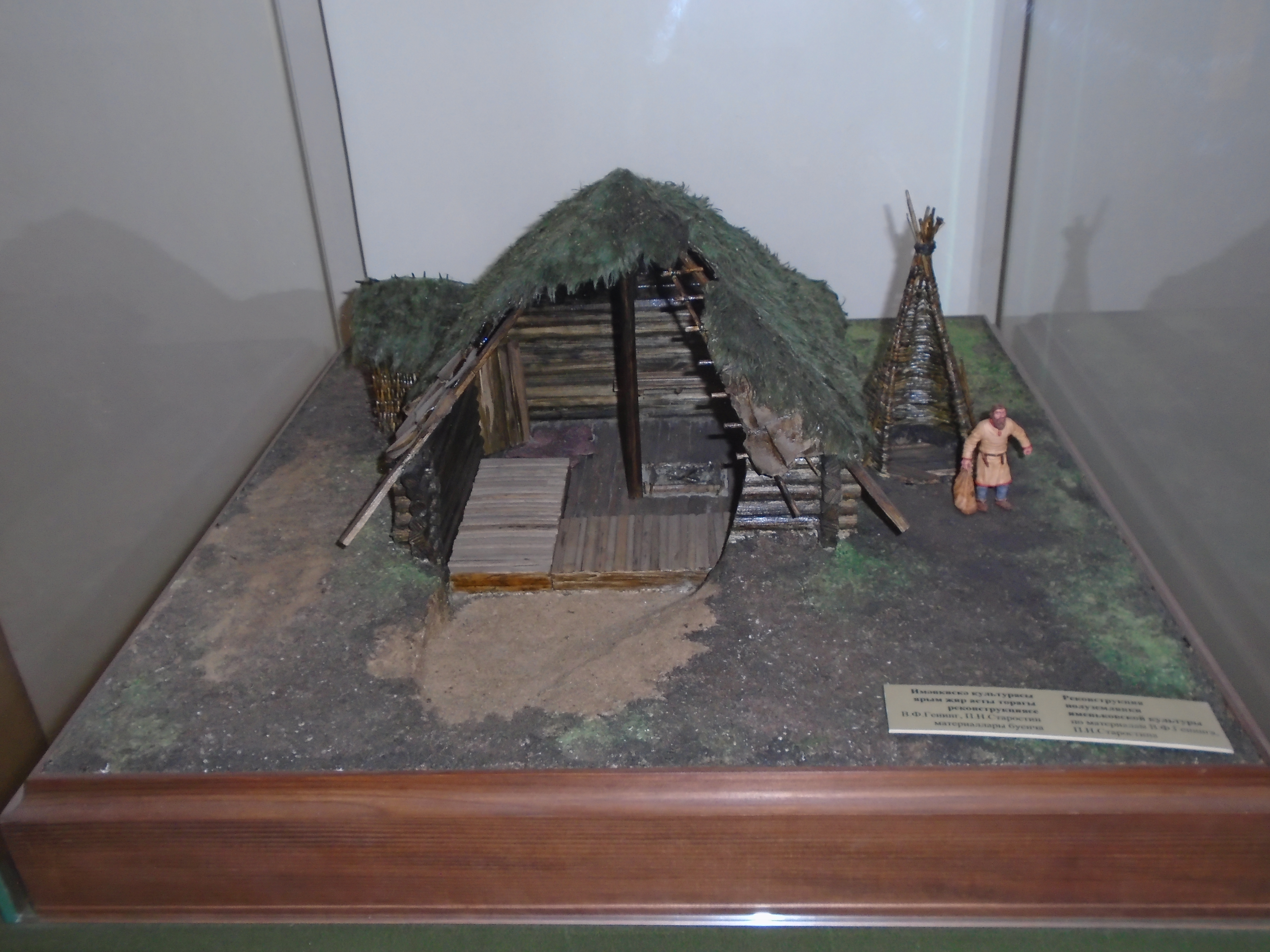
A semi-subterranean dwelling

The Imenkovo culture (Russian: Именьковская культура) was an archaeological culture that, from the 4th to 7th centuries, covered much of the Middle Volga region in modern-day Russia, including parts of Tatarstan, Mordovia, Chuvashia and Samara Oblast. It was named after the Imenkovo settlement in Tatarstan.

The Imenkovo economy centered on advanced agrarian practices, notably plow-based farming with iron tools, cultivating crops such as rye, wheat, and barley, alongside livestock breeding and artisanal crafts like metallurgy and pottery. Settlements featured semi-subterranean dwellings and fortified hillforts, while distinctive ceramics reflected ties to western cultures (Zarubintsy, Przeworsk). Despite the absence of identified burial sites, which complicates insights into ritual practices, the culture's technological influence on neighboring Finno-Ugric groups is evident in agricultural and metalworking techniques.

Ethnic attribution remains contentious, with scholars proposing Slavic, Balto-Slavic, or Turkic origins. For instance, Turkic links are posited based on later assimilation with Bulgar groups, though evidence remains sparse. Critics of these theories emphasize the culture's eclectic traits and the lack of definitive proof, underscoring its complex intercultural dynamics.

The culture's decline in the late 7th century coincided with the arrival of the Bulgars, leading to the assimilation of most Imenkovo communities. Valentin Sedov proposed the westward migration of others, who later contributed to the formation of the Volyntsevo culture (linked to the Severians of Slavic chronicles).

== Proposed Balto-Slavic affiliation ==
Proponents of a Slavic connection (starting with Galina Matveyeva in 1981) highlight parallels in material culture, including tools and pottery, with the post-Zarubintsy and early Kiev cultural traditions. A Slavic connection has been tentatively supported by some archaeogenetic studies. According to Sergey Klyashtorny, a "para-Slavic" group on the Middle Volga could explain why some Arab authors placed the Saqaliba people (i.e., Slavs) in the Middle Volga region.

In 2006, Vladimir Napolskikh suggested many potential Balto-Slavic linguistic traces in the Proto-Permic language, including important agricultural terms such as ruʒeg (“rye”), and explained them as loans from the "Imenkovo language". His Balto-Slavic hypothesis suggests a distinct dialectal branch interacting with local Finno-Ugric populations.
