= Imenkovo =

İmänkiskä Имәнкискә
- selo
- Location within Tatarstan
- Country: Russia
- Region: Tatarstan
- District: Layış District

Population (2008)
  - Total: 655
- Time zone: UTC+3:00

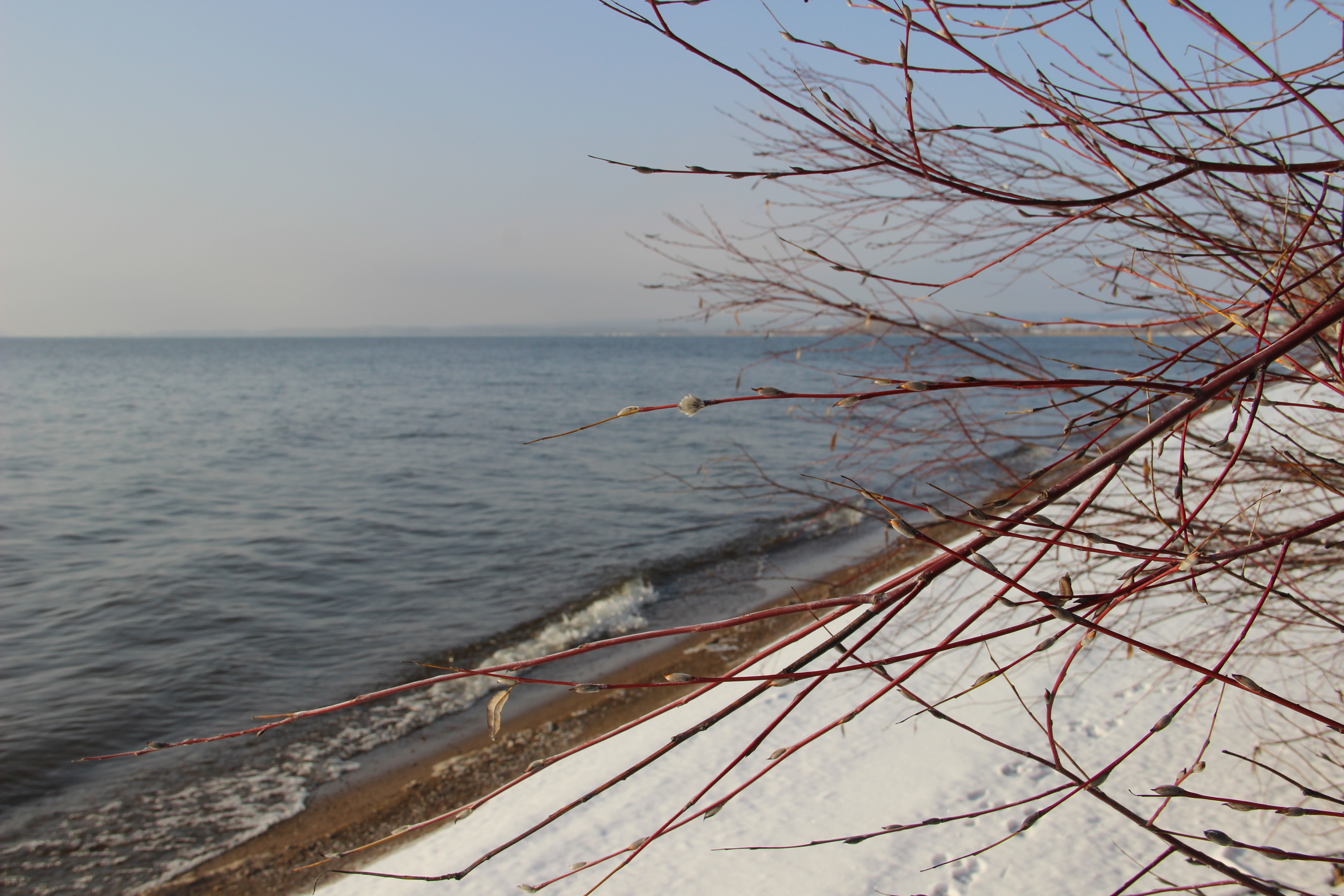
Imenkovo. Laishevsky district, 2015

Imenkovo (Именьково) or İmänkiskä (Tatar: Имәнкискә, romanized: İmänkiskä) is a rural locality (a selo) in Layış District, Tatarstan. The population was 587 as of 2010. İmänkiskä is located 16 km from Layış, district's administrative centre, and 57 km from Qazan, republic's capital, by road. The village was established in 1970s and contains 7 streets. The Imenkovo archaeological culture takes its name from this settlement.
