= Ethnofuturism =

Philosophical movement

Ethnofuturism (Estonian: Etnofuturism) is an artistic and philosophic movement originating from Estonia that has gone through different phases.

== Initial phase ==
The term "ethnofuturism" was coined by Estonian poet Karl Martin Sinijärv. The origins of ethnofuturism can be traced back to the Singing Revolution of Estonia in the late 1980s, when the nationalists of the Baltic region developed the philosophy in order to unite and create a common civilisational platform.

During its initial phase from 1989 to 1994, it was an avant-garde artistic movement with emphasis on futurism and was characterized by parody, absurdity and provocative statements. In the second phase, starting with the First Ethnofuturist Manifesto in 1994, the focus shifted to the ethnic elements, foregrounding folklore, borealism and the issues of the Finno-Ugric peoples.

== Adoption by political right ==
In the late 2010s, the term was adopted by the Estonian and international alt-right movement to describe their ethnonationalistic agenda. Ethnofuturism considers imperialism as a major obstacle to identity-based nationalism. Its goal is to create a new European civilization which centers upon the collective identity of Eastern Europe, called Intermarium, thereby bringing an end of both American and Russian imperialism and replacing them with white ethnostates. Ethnofuturism consists of a cultural and civilisational dimension to foster a geopolitical block of countries from the Baltic until the Black Sea.

Ethnofuturist philosophy has been popular among politicians of the Conservative People's Party of Estonia and the National Alliance from Latvia, most notably Ruuben Kaalep and Raivis Zeltīts. They are closely linked with the Ukrainian nationalists and organizations from the Visegrád Group member states who share similar ideologies. The National Corps in Ukraine also shares and supports ethnofuturist philosophy.

Ethnofuturism regards regional imperialist and supremacist ideologies as an obstacle since it emphasizes collaboration among nationalists of different countries. Using definitions of ethnicity in the region that are blood and soil–based, ethnofuturism centers around unifying these regionally sourced identities with one another. Many Ethnofuturists think humans and nature are entwined in an all-worldly collective.

== See also ==
- Ethnocacerism
- Meryan ethnofuturism
