= Finno-Samic languages =

Subdivision of the Uralic languages

Finno-Samic
- (controversial)
- Geographic distribution: Northern Fennoscandia, Baltic states
- Linguistic classification: Uralic: Finno-Ugric?; Finno-Permic?; Finno-Volgaic?; Finno-Samic
- Subdivisions: Sami; Finnic

Language codes
- Glottolog: None
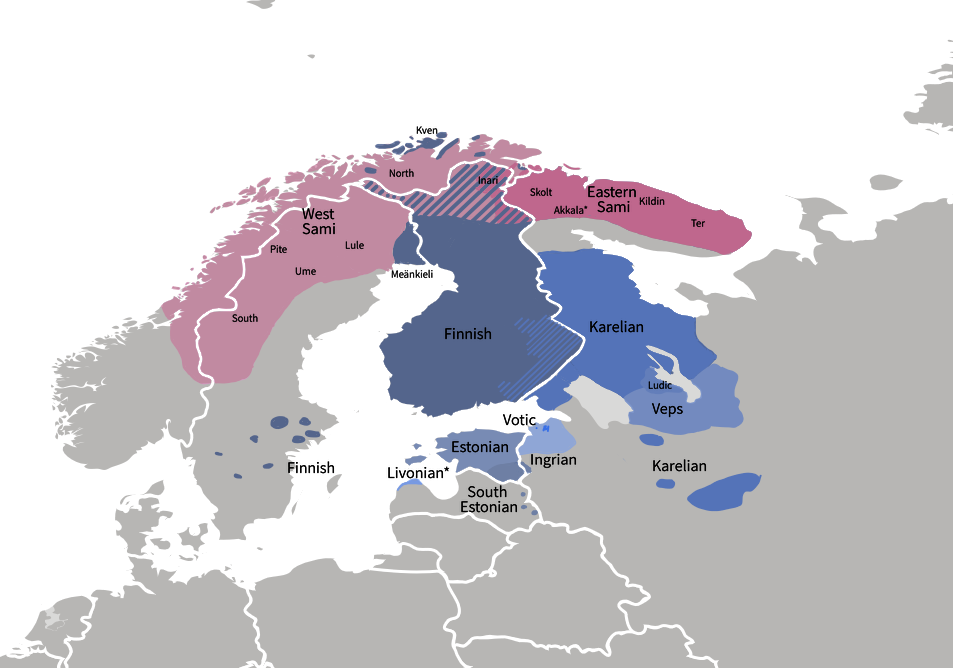
- Approximate distribution of Finno-Samic languages, across Northern Europe.

The Finno-Samic languages (Note: Variants of the name include Finno-Saamic, Finno-Lappic, Fenno-Saamic, or Saamic–Fennic.) are a hypothetical subgroup of the Uralic family, and are made up of 22 languages classified into either the Sami languages, which are spoken by the Sami people who inhabit the Sápmi region of northern Fennoscandia, or Finnic languages, which include the major languages Finnish and Estonian. The grouping is not universally recognized as valid.

== Related hypotheses ==
The Mordvinic languages appear to also align closely with both Finnic and Samic. Some innovations in the consonant system are shared by Finnic and Mordvinic specifically, while a number of innovations in the vowel system are shared by Samic and Mordvinic specifically.

The Mari language shows a smaller number of similarities with all three of these, and a larger grouping encompassing Finnic, Samic, Mordvinic and Mari is sometimes posited (the Finno-Volgaic languages).

Helimski (2006) proposes a "Northwest" group of Finno-Ugric languages, encompassing not only Finnic and Sami, but also extinct languages once spoken in the north of European Russia, traceable only as substrata, especially in toponymy.

== Arguments for and against genetic unity ==
The common ancestor of Finnic and Samic is traditionally known as Early Proto-Finnic (Finnish: varhaiskantasuomi). Its phonology and morphology can be reconstructed in great detail. However, this reconstruction turns out to be nearly identical to assumed preceding stages such as Proto-Finno-Volgaic, Proto-Finno-Ugric, and even Proto-Uralic itself.

There are a number of noticeable traits common to most Finno-Samic languages, however none of them unquestionably in favor of a family unity. The first of these is the presence of consonant gradation, found in all of the languages except the marginal languages of the group, Livonian, Veps and Southern Sami. Gradation is also found in the distantly related Samoyedic Nganasan, and it has been debated if gradation is an original Uralic feature suppressed in all other branches, an independent innovation in Finno-Lappic and Nganasan, or independent in all three of Finnic, Samic and Nganasan. Also, even if gradation in Finnic and Samic is connected, it is disputed whether this represents common inheritance or later contact influence.

The contrastive presence of rounded vowels beyond the first syllable, atypical of Uralic languages in general, is also found in both Finnic and Samic (and again also Samoyedic). This too has been argued to represent later contact influence, on the basis of comparisons such as F. *enoj : S. *eanoj "maternal uncle", where the exclusively Finnic development *aj > *oj appears to have been loaned into Samic. There is also considerable disagreement between the languages (both between the two families, and within them) in whether certain words contain a rounded vowel.

The loss of initial *w before a short rounded vowel has also been proposed as a common innovation, but with counterexamples such as Estonian võtta- "to take" (with *w preserved as its regular reflex /ʋ/ due to the development *o > /ɤ/) suggesting a date postdating not only the split between Finnic and Samic, but also of northern and southern Finnic (cf. Finnish otta-). (A complementary epenthesis of *w before initial long rounded vowels is accepted to not represent common inheritance, as it occurs also before long vowels resulting from the exclusively Samic development *a > *ō.)

For morphological features common to Samic and Finnic formerly thought to represent Finno-Samic innovations, explanations have likewise been offered either of common Uralic inheritance or of independent innovation.

=== Lexicon ===
Approximately 600 native word roots are shared by the Finnic and Samic languages, of which approximately 100 lack cognates in the other Uralic languages. However, the high number of Finnic loanwords in Samic makes exact analysis difficult, and old loanwords from Samic to Finnic may also be involved, especially in light of approximately a third of these words being absent also from the more southern Finnic languages (Estonian, Livonian and Votic). These numbers can be contrasted with ca. 40 word roots exclusive to Finnic and Mordvinic, 12 word roots exclusive to Samic and Mordvinic, and 22 word roots exclusive to all three.

Additionally a large number of early loanwords from the Germanic languages, and a small number from the Baltic languages, are found in both Finnic and Samic. Such words cannot however provide clear evidence for a Finno-Samic grouping, as the possibility remains that these have been acquired separately by early Finnic and early Samic, after their initial separation but prior to the development of their most distinctive features.
