= International Finno-Ugric Students' Conference =

IFUSCO (International Finno-Ugric Students' Conference) is an annual international conference for and by the students of Finno-Ugric languages and peoples.

IFUSCO conference contains presentations and workshops on linguistics, ethnography, folkloristics, archaeology, history, museology, literature, translation theory, sociology, law, music, mythology, regional issues, education, economics etc., that are connected to the lives of speakers of Finno-Ugric languages. In addition, IFUSCO offers different events related to the Finno-Ugric cultures and the host country.

IFUSCO has always been a multilingual conference, featuring the Uralic languages as well as English, Russian and German. One of IFUSCO's long-standing traditions is the three-language rule, according to which every presentation must consist of three languages – one for the abstract of the presentation, one for its handouts or slides, and one for the speech itself.

Every hosting students’ committee is also presenting a unique emblem of the year's event that serves as a logo for the whole conference.

== History ==
IFUSCO was created in 1984 in Göttingen by local students of Finno-Ugric studies, to facilitate contact between other students. The conference was initially a small gathering that mainly served as a forum and as a way of exchanging information. The first IFUSCO had 26 participants from the Netherlands (Groningen) and Germany (Göttingen, Hamburg). Later it has turned into a conference format where lectures are given by and for students.

IFUSCO is organized in a different city and by a different university every year. Since the first conference there have been 41 IFUSCOs held in 23 different cities and 10 different countries. Russian universities have organised the largest number of conferences, eight in total, the first of which was held in 1999 in Syktyvkar and the latest in 2013 in the same city. Among individual cities, Helsinki has hosted the most conferences, with total of five.

The conference has been cancelled twice in its history. First cancellation happened in 2001, when the conference was supposed to be held in Izhevsk, Russia. In 2020 the conference was meant to be held by Riga, Latvia, but got postponed until the following year due to COVID-19. IFUSCO in 2021 was held fully online. The conferences after that have offered a chance for partial online participation.

In 2016 IFUSCO was originally supposed to be held in Khanty-Mansiysk on 7–9 April. It was postponed twice before finally being cancelled. However, the Finnish students of Finno-Ugric studies organized its small version at the University of Helsinki in order to keep the tradition.

== Locations and dates ==
Year	Host city	Dates
1984	(Germany) Göttingen	25–27 May
1985	(Germany) Hamburg	
1986	(Netherlands) Groningen	
1987	(Hungary) Budapest	24–28 May
1988	(Finland) Helsinki	22–26 May
1989	(Austria) Vienna	14–18 May
1990	(Estonia) Tartu	
1991	(Germany) Greifswald	19–23 May
1992	(Germany) Munich	
1993	(Czech Republic) Prague	
1994	(Poland) Poznań	
1995	(Hungary) Szeged	
1996	(Germany) Hamburg	24–28 April
1997	(Finland) Turku	20–24 May
1998	(Hungary) Pécs	20–25 May
1999	(Russia) Syktyvkar	10–14 May
2000	(Estonia) Tallinn	3–7 August
2001	Cancelled	
2002	(Finland) Helsinki	11–15 September
2003	(Russia) Syktyvkar	24–26 September
2004	(Hungary) Budapest	3–8 May
2005	(Russia) Izhevsk	12–15 May
2006	(Russia) Yoshkar-Ola	12–15 May
2007	(Russia) Saransk	15–19 May
2008	(Finland) Helsinki	14–18 May
2009	(Russia) Petrozavodsk	14–16 May
2010	(Russia) Kudymkar	14–16 May
2011	(Hungary) Budapest	9–11 May
2012	(Estonia) Tartu	8–11 May
2013	(Russia) Syktyvkar	6–8 May
2014	(Germany) Göttingen	9–11 April
2015	(Hungary) Pécs	16–19 April
2016	(Finland) Helsinki	15–18 September
2017	(Poland) Warsaw	18–22 September
2018	(Estonia) Tartu	2–5 May
2019	(Austria) Vienna	23–27 April
2020	Cancelled	
2021	(Latvia) Riga	11–12 May
2022	(Czech Republic) Prague	23–27 May
2023	(Finland) Turku	15–19 May
2024	(Hungary) Budapest	27–31 May
2025	(Austria) Vienna	22–26 April
2026	(Finland) Helsinki	11–15 May
2027	(Estonia) Tartu	TBA
