= Muromian language =

Extinct language formerly spoken by the Muromian tribe

Muromian
- Muromanian
- Native to: Russia
- Region: Murom region
- Ethnicity: Muromians
- Extinct: 10th century
- Language family: Uralic: Mordvinic?/Merya?; Muromian

Language codes
- ISO 639-3: None (mis)
- Linguist List: 0te
- An approximate map of the non-Varangian cultures in European Russia, in the 9th century. The Muromian area is shown in bright green.

Muromian is an extinct Uralic language formerly spoken by the Muromian tribe, in what is today the Murom region in Russia. They are mentioned by Jordanes as Mordens and in the Primary Chronicle. Very little is known about the language, but it was probably either closely related to the Mordvinic languages, or a language closely related to Meryan. Muromian probably became extinct in the Middle Ages around the 10th century, as the Muromians were assimilated by the Slavs. The Muromian language is unattested, but is assumed to have been Uralic, and has frequently been placed in the Volga-Finnic category.

== Toponymy ==
A. K. Matveyev identified the toponymic area upon Lower Oka and Lower Klyazma, which corresponds with Muroma. According to the toponymy, the Muroma language was close to the Merya language. A few words have been reconstructed in the Muroma language, based on toponyms, such as: *juga 'river', *vi̮ksa ‘river connecting two bodies of water', and *voht(V) ‘neck of land between two bodies of water’.
