= Meryan ethnofuturism =

Religious and ethnocultural movement in Russia

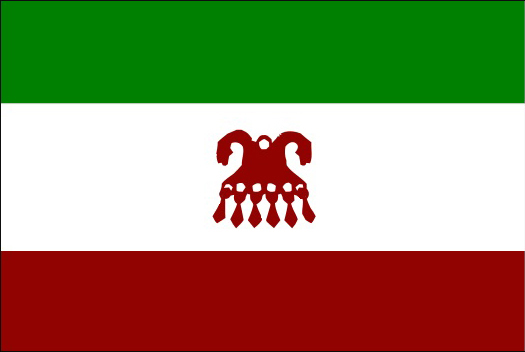
Flag of Neo-Meryan people

Meryan ethnofuturism is a modern revival or re-creation of the culture and language of the Meryans, an extinct Finnic people who inhabited the Upper Volga region, and were assimilated by Russians.

== Historic Meryans ==
The Merya tribe inhabited the Upper Volga region until the 11th century CE.

== Modern ethnofuturist movement ==
Meryan ethnofuturism refers to the revitalization of the tribe's culture through artistic and intellectual reconstruction of ancient Merya cultural traditions, based on archaeological research and regional studies, as well as the creative imagination of its proponents.

Since the early 21st century, a "Meryan renaissance" has been observed in the Volga-Oka interfluve, which has manifested in the formation of a new ethnocultural identity among certain members of the local population employed in creative and academic-pedagogical professions. The neo-Meryan movement aims to rid the Russian population of the Upper Volga region of perceived excessive statism and instead promote patriotism toward their small homeland. Activists in the movement believe that local residents are descendants of the Merya people, who, according to proponents, lived there before the formation of the Old Russian state and subsequent Slavic colonization of the area.

According to its leaders, the neo-Merian movement is neither political nor religious, but rather purely sociocultural and secular in nature, although it does not entirely avoid religious reconstruction, for example, Meryan mythology, using Mari and Erzya myths as comparative sources. Currently, the most prominent figure in the movement is the Moscow and Kostroma artist and local historian, founder of the internet portal "Merjamaa: Merian Heritage of Russia" Andrei Malyshev. After his first exhibition in Kiev (2003), he began active involvement in "neo-Merian" activities in 2010 and has since held several exhibitions dedicated to the movement.

== See also ==
- Cherokee descent
- Ethnofuturism
- Indigenismo in the United States
- Merya language
- Khoisan revivalism
- National revival
- Silent Souls
- Uralic neopaganism
- Volga Finns
