= Volga Finns =

Historical group of Uralic peoples in Russia

Approximate ethno-linguistic map of European Russia in the 9th century: the five Volga Finnic groups of the Merya, Mari, Muromians, Meshchera and Mordvins are shown as being surrounded by the Slavs to the west, the (Finnic) Veps to the northwest, the Permians to the northeast, and the (Turkic) Bulgars and Khazars to the southeast and south.

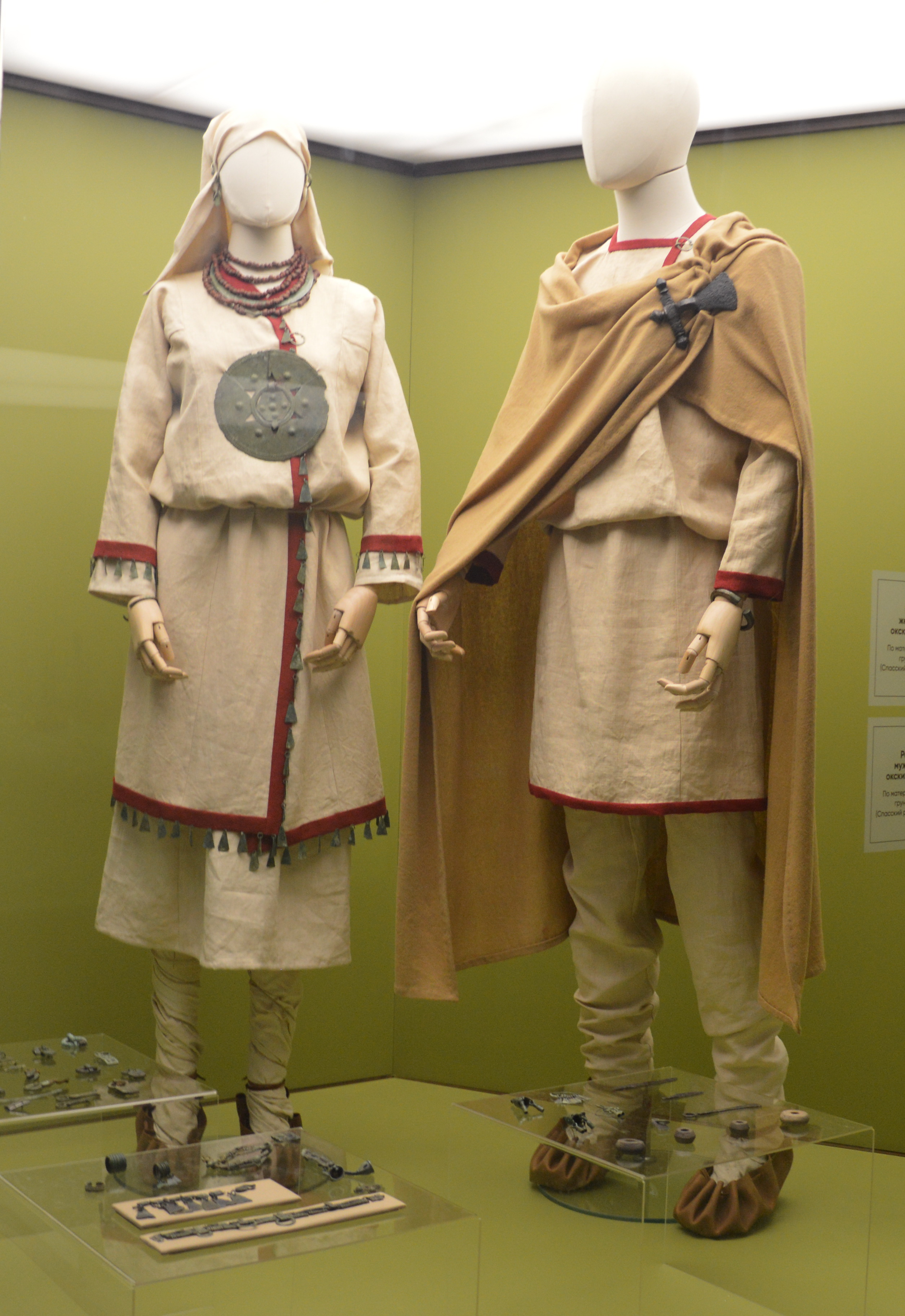
Reconstructions of Finnic clothes of 5-7th century, Ryazan-Oka culture.

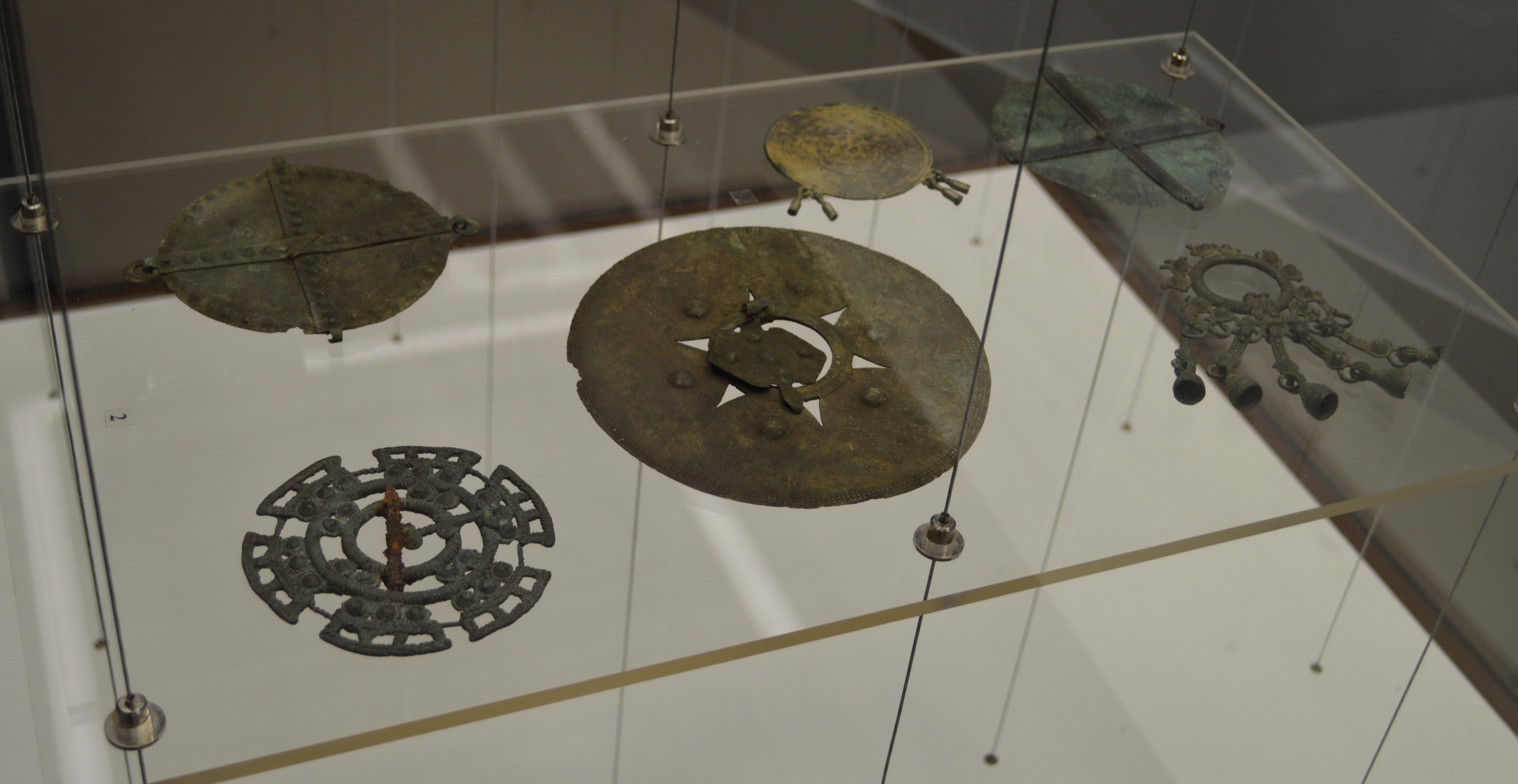
Oka Finns jewellery, 4-7th century.

The Volga Finns (Note: Also known as Volga Finnic peoples, Volga Finno-Ugrians, or Eastern Finns.) are a historical group of peoples living in the vicinity of the Volga, who speak Uralic languages. Their modern representatives are the Mari people, the Erzya and the Moksha (commonly grouped together as Mordvins) as well as speakers of the extinct Merya, Muromian and Meshchera languages.

The modern representatives of Volga Finns live in the basins of the Sura and Moksha rivers, as well as (in smaller numbers) in the interfluve between the Volga and the Belaya rivers. The Mari language has two dialects, the Meadow Mari and the Hill Mari.

Traditionally the Mari and the Mordvinic languages (Erzya and Moksha) were considered to form a Volga-Finnic or Volgaic group within the Uralic language family, accepted by linguists like Robert Austerlitz (1968), Aurélien Sauvageot & Karl Heinrich Menges (1973) and Harald Haarmann (1974), but rejected by others like Björn Collinder (1965) and Robert Thomas Harms (1974). This grouping has also been criticized by Salminen (2002), who suggests it may be simply a geographic, not a phylogenetic, group.

== Mari ==
The Mari or Cheremis (Russian: черемисы, romanized: cheremisy; Tatar: Çirmeş) have traditionally lived along the Volga and Kama rivers in Russia. The majority of Maris today live in the Mari El Republic, with significant populations in the Tatarstan and Bashkortostan republics. The Mari people consists of three different groups: the Meadow Mari, who live along the left bank of the Volga, the Mountain Mari, who live along the right bank of the Volga, and Eastern Mari, who live in the Bashkortostan republic. In the 2002 Russian census, 604,298 people identified themselves as "Mari," with 18,515 of those specifying that they were Mountain Mari and 56,119 as Eastern Mari. Almost 60% of Mari lived in rural areas.

== Merya ==
The Merya people (Russian: меря, merya; also Merä) inhabited a territory corresponding roughly to the present-day area of the Golden Ring or Zalesye regions of Russia, including the modern-day Moscow, Yaroslavl, Kostroma, Ivanovo, and Vladimir oblasts. In the modern Vepsian language, the word meri means 'sea'. It is likely that they were peacefully assimilated by the East Slavs after their territory was incorporated into Rus' in the 10th century.

In the 6th century Jordanes mentioned them briefly (as Merens); later the Primary Chronicle described them in more detail. Soviet archaeologists believed that the capital of the Merya was Sarskoe Gorodishche near the bank of the Nero Lake to the south of Rostov. The annalists also mention the Merya people in connection with some notable events: in 859 they were taxed by the Vikings, and in 862 they took part in the battle against them. In 882 they accompanied Oleg to Kiev, where he established his power, and in 907 they were among the participants in Oleg's Byzantine campaign. In 1235, the Friar Julian sets out to visit the Hungarians who remain in the east. In his second travelogue, he mentions that the Tatars have conquered a country called Merovia.

One hypothesis classifies the Merya as a western branch of the Mari people rather than as a separate tribe. Their ethnonyms are basically identical, Merya being a Russian transcription of the Mari self-designation, Мäрӹ (Märӛ).

The unattested Merya language is traditionally assumed to have been a member of the Volga-Finnic group. This view has been challenged: Eugene Helimski supposes that the Merya language was closer to the "northwest" group of Finno-Ugric (Balto-Finnic and Sami), and Gábor Bereczki supposes that the Merya language was a part of the Balto-Finnic group.

The Meryans were stated to have fought with the Bulgars in wars against Tatars.

Some of the inhabitants of several districts of Kostroma and Yaroslavl oblasts present themselves as Meryan, although, in recent censuses, they were registered as Russians. The modern Merya people have their websites displaying their flag, coat of arms and national anthem, and participate in discussions on the subject in Finno-Ugric networks.

2010 saw the release of the film Ovsyanki (literal translation: 'The Buntings', English title: Silent Souls), based on the novel of the same name, devoted to the imagined life of modern Merya (or Meadow Mari) people.

In the early 21st century, a new type of social movement, the so-called "Meryan ethnofuturism", has emerged. It is distributed across central regions of Russia, for example, in Moscow, Pereslavl-Zalessky, Kostroma Oblast, and Plyos. In May 2014, the New Gallery in the city of Ivanovo opened the art project mater Volga, Sacrum during the "Night of Museums". In October 2014, a presentation of "Merya Language" was held at the III Festival of Languages at Novgorod University.

== Meshchera ==
The Meshchera (Russian: мещера, meshchera or мещёра, meshchyora) lived in the territory lying between the Oka River and the Klyazma River. It was a land of forests, bogs and lakes. The area is still called the Meshchera Lowlands.

The first Russian written source that mentions them is the Tolkovaya Paleya, from the 13th century. They are also mentioned in several later Russian chronicles from the period before the 16th century. This is in stark contrast to the related tribes Merya and Muroma, which appear to have been assimilated by the East Slavs by the 10th and the 11th centuries.

Ivan II, prince of Moscow, wrote in his 1358 will, about the village Meshcherka, which he had bought from the native Meshcherian chieftain Alexander Ukovich. The village appears to have been converted to the Christian Orthodox faith and to have been a vassal of Muscovy.

The Meschiera (along with Mordua, Sibir, and a few other harder-to-interpret groups) are mentioned in the "Province of Russia" on the Venetian Fra Mauro Map (ca. 1450).

Several documents mention the Meshchera concerning the Kazan campaign by Ivan the Terrible in the 16th century. These accounts concern a state of Meshchera (known under a tentative name of Temnikov Meshchera, after its central town of Temnikov) which had been assimilated by the Mordvins and the Tatars. Prince A. M. Kurbsky wrote that the Mordvin language was spoken in the lands of the Meshchera.

The Meshchera language is unattested, and theories on its affiliation remain speculative. Some linguists think that it might have been a dialect of Mordvinic, while Pauli Rahkonen has suggested on the basis of toponymic evidence that it was a Permic or closely related language. Rahkonen's speculation has been criticized by other scientists, such as by the Russian Uralist Vladimir Napolskikh.

Some toponyms which Rahkonen suggested as Permic are the hydronyms stems: Un-, Ič-, Ul and Vil-, which can be compared to Udmurt uno 'big', iči 'little', vi̮l 'upper' and ulo 'lower'. Rahkonen also theorized the name Meshchera itself could be a Permic word, and its cognate be Komi mösör 'isthmus'.

== Mordvins ==
The Mordvins (also Mordva, Mordvinians) remain among the larger indigenous peoples of Russia. Less than one third of Mordvins live in the autonomous republic of Mordovia, Russian Federation, in the basin of the Volga River. They consist of two major subgroups, the Erzya and Moksha, besides the smaller subgroups of the Qaratay, Teryukhan and Tengushevo (or Shoksha) Mordvins who have become fully Russified or Turkified during the 19th to 20th centuries.

The Erzya Mordvins (Erzya: эрзят, Erzyat; also Erzia, Erzä), who speak Erzya, and the Moksha Mordvins (Moksha: мокшет, Mokshet), who speak Moksha, are the two major groups. The Qaratay Mordvins live in Kama Tamağı District of Tatarstan, and have shifted to speaking Tatar, albeit with a large proportion of Mordvin vocabulary (substratum). The Teryukhan, living in the Nizhny Novgorod Oblast of Russia, switched to Russian in the 19th century. The Teryukhans recognize the term Mordva as pertaining to themselves, whereas the Qaratay also call themselves Muksha. The Tengushevo Mordvins are a transitional group between Moksha and Erzya. They are also called Shoksha (or Shokshot). They are isolated from the bulk of the Erzyans, and their dialect/language has been influenced by the Mokshan dialects.

== Muroma ==
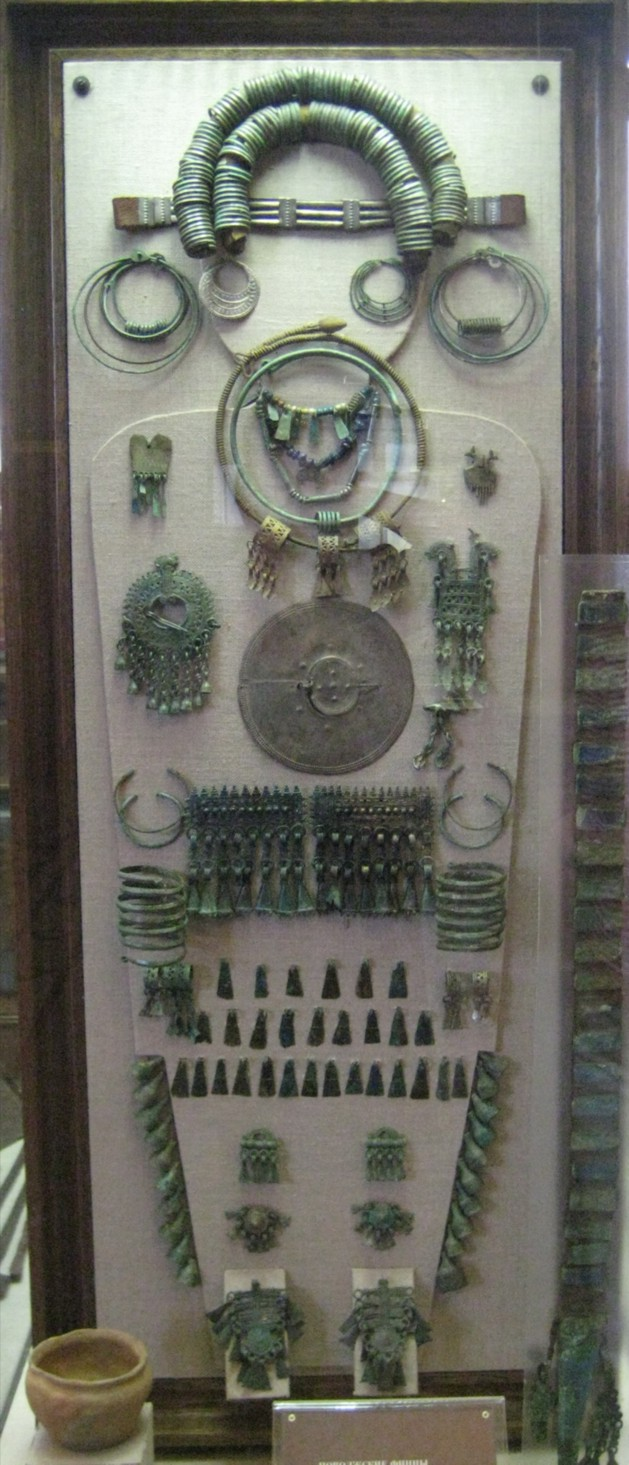
Reconstruction of women's clothing and headdress metal parts from a 9th-10th century Muroma tomb.

The Muromians (Russian: Мурома, romanized: Muroma) lived in the Oka River basin. They are mentioned in the Primary Chronicle and the Rogozh Chronicler. The Muromas, as an ethnic group, were formed around the seventh century AD, according to the dating of the Muroma cemeteries. The old town of Murom still bears their name. The Muromians paid tribute to the Rus' princes and, like the neighbouring Merya tribe, were assimilated by the East Slavs in the 11th to 12th century as their territory was incorporated into the Rus'. A group of them migrated to the Carpathian Basin with the Hungarians, or Bulgars, as they are listed by the Rogozh Chronicler, among the peoples who inhabited the Carpathian Basin in 897.

During the excavation of the Muroma tombs, archaeologists uncovered a rich archaeological legacy. Weapons were among the best in the surrounding areas in terms of workmanship, and the jewellery, which is found in abundance in the burials, is remarkable for its ingenuity of form and meticulous workmanship. The Muroma were characterised by arc-shaped head ornaments woven from horsehair and strips of leather, which were spirally braided with bronze wire. This is interesting because it is not observed in other Volga Finnic peoples.

Like other medieval Volga Finns, animal bones were present in the burials as funeral food. Horses were buried separately, bridled and saddled, giving them a pose imitating a living animal lying on its belly with legs tucked up and head raised (it was placed on a step in the grave).

In 2023, 13 Muroma tombs were excavated on the banks of the Oka River, accompanied by a number of artefacts - one of which was a belt buckle, which was most similar to the belt buckles of the conquering Hungarians. Weapons such as spears and axes, as well as coins (dirhams) and five lead weights, among other things, were recovered from the grave of one of the presumably noble men.

The Muroma settlements were located on high ground above the floodplain meadows. Livestock farming formed the basis of the Muroma economy, with pigs, large horned cattle, and to a lesser extent, sheep being raised. Horses played a special role, and they were also bred for meat. The slash-and-burn agriculture played a minor role in their economy. Their commercial hunting was aimed at fur hunting.

The Primary Chronicle provides details about the Muromians: "Along the river Oka, which flows into the Volga, the Muroma, the Cheremisians, and the Mordva preserve their native languages." The Rogozh Chronicler says: "In the year 6405 (897) there were Slavs living along the Danube, as well as the Ugrics, Muromas and the Danubian Bulgars."

== See also ==
- Baltic Finns
- Permians
