= Finno-Permic languages =

Subdivision of the Uralic languages

Finno-Permic
- Finnic
- (proposed)
- Geographic distribution: Northern Fennoscandia, Baltic states, Southwestern, Southeastern, and Ural region of Russia
- Ethnicity: Finnic peoples
- Linguistic classification: Uralic: Finno-Ugric?; Finno-Permic
- Subdivisions: Permic; Balto-Finnic; Sámi; Mari; Mordvin

Language codes
- Glottolog: None
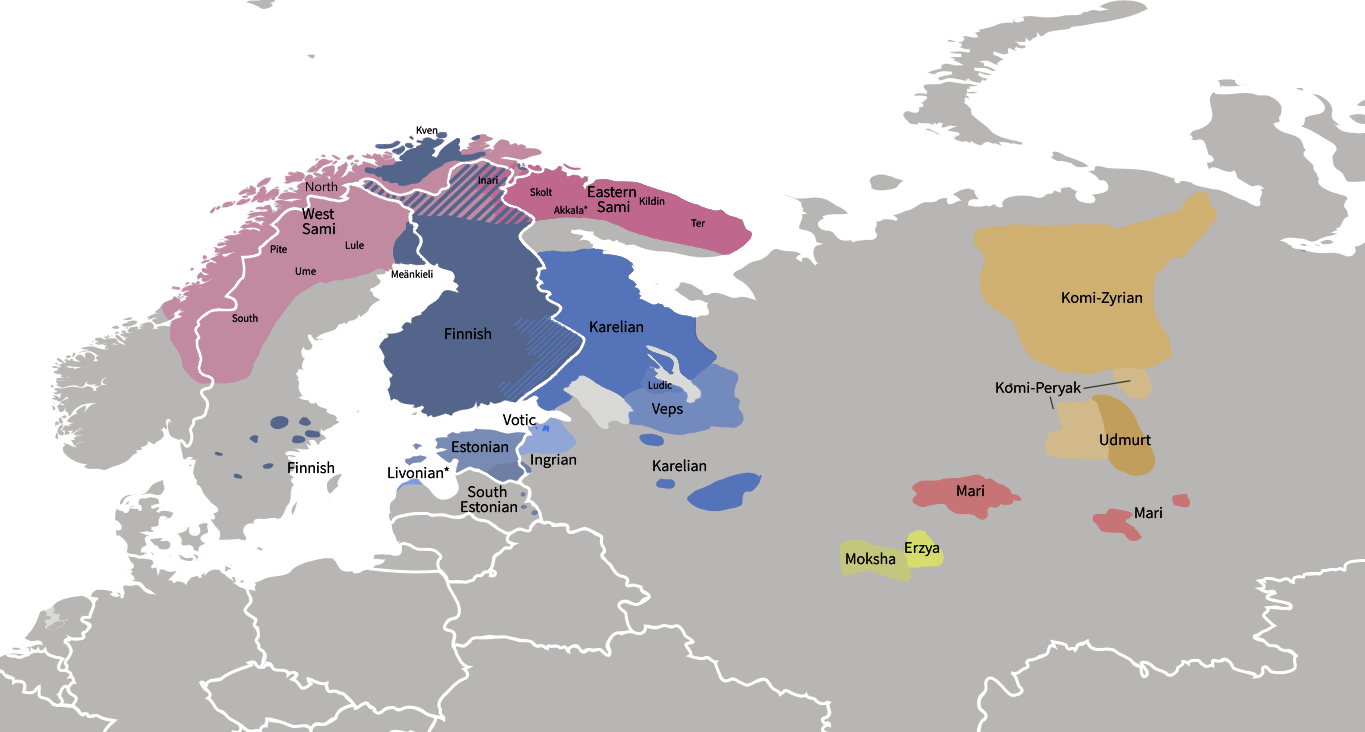
- The Finno-Permic languages

The Finno-Permic or Finno-Permian languages, sometimes just Finnic languages, are a proposed subdivision of the Uralic languages which comprise the Balto-Finnic languages, Sámi languages, Mordvinic languages, Mari language, Permic languages and likely a number of extinct languages. In the traditional taxonomy of the Uralic languages, Finno-Permic is estimated to have split from Finno-Ugric around 3000–2500 BC, and branched into Permic languages and Finno-Volgaic languages around 2000 BC. Nowadays the validity of the group as a taxonomical entity is being questioned, and the interrelationships of its five branches are debated with little consensus.

The term Finnic languages has often been used to designate all the Finno-Permic languages, with the term Balto-Finnic used to disambiguate the Finnic languages proper. However, in many works, Finnic refers to the Baltic-Finnic languages alone.

== Subclassification ==
The subclassification of the Finno-Permic languages varies among scholars. During the 20th century, most classifications treated Permic vs Finno-Volgaic as the primary division. In the 21st century, Tapani Salminen rejected Finno-Permic and Finno-Volgaic entirely. Other classifications treat the five branches of Finno-Permic as follows.

Janhunen (2009)	Häkkinen (2007)	Lehtinen (2007)	Michalove (2002)	Kulonen (2002)
Permic; Finno-Volgaic; Mari; Finno-Samic; Sámi; Finno-Mordvin; Mordvin; Balto-Finnic & Para-Finnic	Mari-Permic; Mari; Permic; Finno-Mordvin; Finnic; Sámi; Mordvin	Permic; Finno-Volgaic; Mari; Mordvin; Finno-Samic; Sámi; Balto-Finnic	Permic; Mari; Sámi; Mordvin; Balto-Finnic	Permic; Mari; Mordvin; Finno-Samic; Sámi; Balto-Finnic

== See also ==
- Proto-Finnic language
