= Vladimir Napolskikh =

Russian ethnographer, historian, and linguist (born 1963)

Vladimir Vladimirovich Napolskikh (Russian: Влади́мир Влади́мирович Напо́льских, born 1 April 1963, Izhevsk, USSR) is a Russian ethnographer, ethnologist, ethnohistorian, Finno-Ugrist and linguist. Doctor of Historical Sciences (1992), corresponding member of the Russian Academy of Sciences (2011).

Napolskikh was based at the Udmurt State University until 2015, then moved to Kazan (joining the Khalikov Institute of Archaeology), then joined the staff of the RANEPA in Moscow. He has published extensively on early Finno-Ugric loanwords from the Proto-Indo-European and Proto-Indo-Iranian languages. Among his better known theories is the existence of a distinct Balto-Slavic group on the Middle Volga that influenced the early Permic languages.

He has served on the editorial board of the journal Archaeology, Ethnology & Anthropology of Eurasia.

== Bibliography ==
- The works of Vladimir Napolskih in the Internet // Udmurtology (in Russian)
- Earth-Diver Myth (А812) in northern Eurasia and North America: twenty years later
- On the literary sources of M. G. Khudiakov’s Song of Udmurt Heroes
- Review on: Eberhard Winkler, Udmurt, München 2001 (Languages of the World. Materials 212). 85 pp.
- Seven Votyak charms
- Uralic Numerals: is the evolution of numeral system reconstructable? (Reading new Václav Blažek’s book on numerals in Eurasia)
