= Finno-Ugric languages =

Disputed subdivision of the Uralic languages

Finno-Ugric
- Finno-Ugrian
- Geographic distribution: Eastern, Central and Northern Europe, North Asia
- Linguistic classification: Uralic: Finno-Ugric
- Subdivisions: Finno-Permic (traditional grouping); Ugric (traditional grouping)

Language codes
- ISO 639-2 / 5: fiu
- Glottolog: None
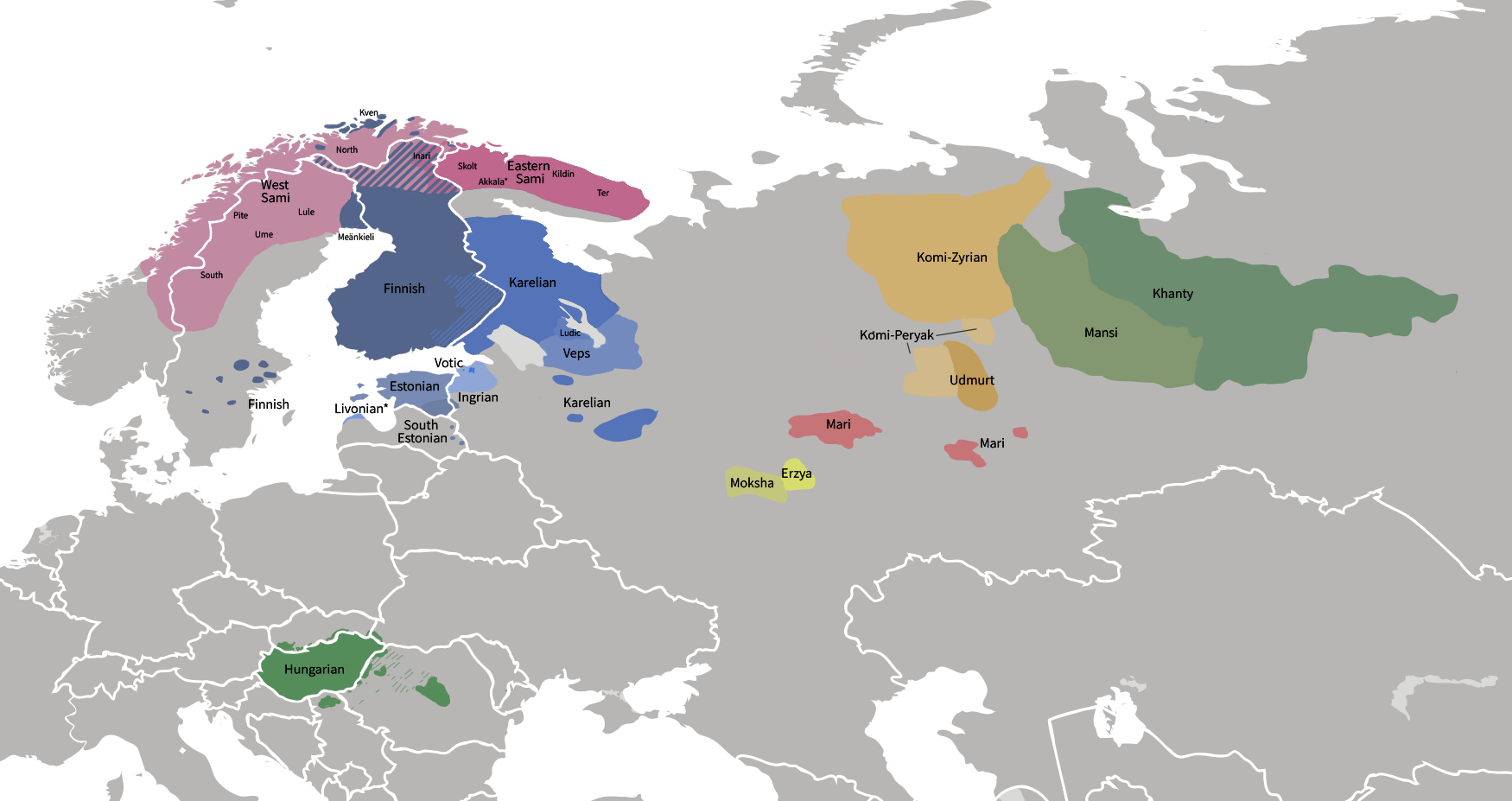
- The Finno-Ugric languages

Finno-Ugric (/ˌfɪnoʊˈjuːɡrɪk, -ˈuː-/) (Note: Variants of the name include Finno-Ugrian, Fenno-Ugric, Fenno-Ugrian, and Ugro-Finnic.) is a traditional linguistic grouping of all languages in the Uralic language family except for the Samoyedic languages. Its once commonly accepted status as a subfamily of Uralic is based on criteria formulated in the 19th century and is criticized by contemporary linguists such as Tapani Salminen and Ante Aikio. The three most spoken Uralic languages, Hungarian, Finnish, and Estonian, are all included in Finno-Ugric.

The term Finno-Ugric, which originally referred to the entire family, is occasionally used as a synonym for the term Uralic, which includes the Samoyedic languages, as commonly happens when a language family is expanded with further discoveries. Before the 20th century, the language family might be referred to as Finnish, Ugric, Finno-Hungarian or with a variety of other names. The name Finno-Ugric came into general use in the late 19th or early 20th century.

== Status ==
The validity of Finno-Ugric as a phylogenic grouping is currently disputed, with some linguists maintaining that the Finno-Permic languages are as distinct from the Ugric languages as they are from the Samoyedic languages spoken in Siberia, or even that none of the Finno-Ugric, Finno-Permic, or Ugric branches has been established. Received opinion is that the easternmost (and last discovered) Samoyed had separated first and the branching into Ugric and Finno-Permic took place later, but this reconstruction does not have strong support in the linguistic data.

== Origins ==
Attempts at reconstructing a Proto-Finno-Ugric proto-language, a common ancestor of all Uralic languages except for the Samoyedic languages, are largely indistinguishable from Proto-Uralic, suggesting that Finno-Ugric might not be a historical grouping but a geographical one, with Samoyedic being distinct by lexical borrowing rather than actually being historically divergent. It has been proposed that the area in which Proto-Finno-Ugric was spoken reached between the Baltic Sea and the Ural Mountains.

Traditionally, the main set of evidence for the genetic proposal of Proto-Finno-Ugric has come from vocabulary. A large amount of vocabulary (e.g. the numerals "one", "three", "four" and "six"; the body-part terms "hand", "head") is only reconstructed up to the Proto-Finno-Ugric level, and only words with a Samoyedic equivalent have been reconstructed for Proto-Uralic. That methodology has been criticised, as no coherent explanation other than inheritance has been presented for the origin of most of the Finno-Ugric vocabulary (though a small number has been explained as old loanwords from Indo-Iranian languages or perhaps other Indo-European languages).

The Samoyedic group has undergone a longer period of independent development, and its divergent vocabulary could be caused by mechanisms of replacement such as language contact. (The Finno-Ugric group is usually dated to approximately 4,000 years ago, the Samoyedic a little over 2,000.) Proponents of the traditional binary division note, however, that the invocation of extensive contact influence on vocabulary is at odds with the grammatical conservatism of Samoyedic.

The consonant *š (voiceless postalveolar fricative, [ʃ]) has not been conclusively shown to occur in the traditional Proto-Uralic lexicon, but it is attested in some of the Proto-Finno-Ugric material. Another feature attested in the Finno-Ugric vocabulary is that *i now behaves as a neutral vowel with respect to front-back vowel harmony, and thus there are roots such as *niwa- "to remove the hair from hides".

Regular sound changes proposed for this stage are few and remain open to interpretation. Sammallahti (1988) proposes five, following Janhunen's (1981) reconstruction of Proto-Finno-Permic:

- Compensatory lengthening: development of long vowels from the cluster of vowel plus a particular syllable-final element, of unknown quality, symbolized by *x
  - Long open *aa and *ää are then raised to mid *oo and *ee respectively.
    - E.g. *ńäxli- → *ńääli- → *ńeeli- "to swallow" (→ Finnish niele-, Hungarian nyel, etc.)
- Raising of short *o to *u in open syllables before a subsequent *i
- Shortening of long vowels in closed syllables and before a subsequent open vowel *a, *ä, predating the raising of *ää and *ee
  - E.g. *ńäxl+mä → *ńäälmä → *ńälmä "tongue" (→ Northern Sámi njalbmi, Hungarian nyelv, etc.)

Sammallahti (1988) further reconstructs sound changes *oo, *ee → *a, *ä (merging with original *a, *ä) for the development from Proto-Finno-Ugric to Proto-Ugric. Similar sound laws are required for other languages as well. Thus, the origin and raising of long vowels may actually belong at a later stage, and the development of these words from Proto-Uralic to Proto-Ugric can be summarized as simple loss of *x (if it existed in the first place at all; vowel length only surfaces consistently in the Baltic-Finnic languages.) The proposed raising of *o has been alternatively interpreted instead as a lowering *u → *o in Samoyedic (PU *lumi → *lomə → Proto-Samoyedic *jom).

Janhunen (2007, 2009) notes a number of derivational innovations in Finno-Ugric, including *ńoma "hare" → *ńoma-la, (vs. Samoyedic *ńomå), *pexli "side" → *peel-ka → *pelka "thumb", though involving Proto-Uralic derivational elements.

== Structural features ==
The Finno-Ugric group is not typologically distinct from Uralic as a whole: the most widespread structural features among the group all extend to the Samoyedic languages as well.

== Common vocabulary ==
=== Loanwords ===
One argument in favor of the Finno-Ugric grouping has come from loanwords. Several loans from the Indo-Iranian languages are present in most or all of the Finno-Ugric branches, while being absent from Samoyedic. However, the majority of them have irregular sound correspondences and have a limited distribution, suggesting that they were borrowed after Uralic had already diversified into its nine branches.

=== Numbers ===
The number systems among the Finno-Ugric languages are particularly distinct from the Samoyedic languages: only the numerals "2", "5", and "7" have cognates in Samoyedic, while also the numerals, "1", "3", "4", "6", "10" are shared by all or most Finno-Ugric languages.

Below are the numbers 1 to 10 in several Finno-Ugric languages. Forms in italic do not descend from the reconstructed forms.

Number	Baltic Finnic				Sámi		Mordvinic		Mari	Permic	Ugric			Proto- Finno- Ugric
Number	Finnish	Estonian	Võro	Livonian	Northern Sámi	Inari Sámi	Erzya	Moksha	Meadow Mari	Komi-Zyrian	Mansi	Khanty	Hungarian	Proto- Finno- Ugric
1	yksi gen.‡ yhden, part. yhtä	üks gen. ühe, part. üht(e)	ütś	ikš	okta	ohtâ	vejke	fkä	ik/ikyt/iktyt/ikte	öťi	akwa	i	egy	*ükti/äkti
2	kaksi gen. kahden, part. kahta	kaks gen. kahe, part. kaht(e)	katś	kakš	guokte	kyeh´ti	kavto	kaftə	kok/kokyt/koktyt	kyk	kitig	kat	kettő/két	*kVkta/kVktä
3	kolme	kolm	kolm	kuolm	golbma	kulmâ	kolmo	kolmə	kum/kumyt	kuim	xūrum	xołəm	három, harm-	*kolmi/kulmi/kurmi
4	neljä	neli	nelli	nēļa	njeallje	nelji	ńiľe	ńiľä	nyl/nylyt	ńoľ	ńila	ńał	négy	*neljä
5	viisi	viis	viiś	vīž	vihtta	vittâ	veƭe	veťä	vič/vizyt	vit	at	wet	öt	*wij(i)t(t)i
6	kuusi	kuus	kuuś	kūž	guhtta	kuttâ	koto	kotə	kud/kudyt	kvajt	xōt	xot	hat	*kuw(V)t(t)i
7	seitsemän	seitse	säidse	seis	čieža	čiččâm	śiśem	śiśäm	šym/šymyt	śiźim	sāt	łapət	hét	śäjśimä/śä(j)ććimä
8	kahdeksan	kaheksa	katõsa	kōdõks	gávcci	käävci	kavkso	kafksə	kandaš/kandaše	kökjamys	ńololow	niwł	nyolc	N/A
9	yhdeksän	üheksa	ütesä	īdõks	ovcci	oovce	vejkse	veçksə	indeš/indeše	ökmys	ontolow	jarťaŋ	kilenc	N/A
10	kymmenen	kümme	kümme	kim	logi	love	kemeń	keməń	lu	das	low	jaŋ	tíz	luka

‡ gen = genitive case, part. = partitive case

The number '2' descends in Ugric from a front-vocalic variant *kektä.

The numbers '9' and '8' in Finnic through Mari are considered to be derived from the numbers '1' and '2' as '10–1' and '10–2'. One reconstruction is *yk+teksa and *kak+teksa, respectively, where *teksa cf. deka is an Indo-European loan; the difference between /t/ and /d/ is not phonemic, unlike in Indo-European. Another analysis is *ykt-e-ksa, *kakt-e-ksa, with *e being the negative verb.

=== Finno-Ugric Swadesh lists ===
100-word Swadesh lists for certain Finno-Ugric languages can be compared and contrasted at the Rosetta Project website: Finnish, Estonian, Hungarian, and Erzya.

== Speakers ==
The four largest ethnic groups that speak Finno-Ugric languages are the Hungarians (14.5 million), Finns (6.5 million), Estonians (1.1 million), and Mordvins (0.85 million). Majorities of three (the Hungarians, Finns, and Estonians) inhabit their respective nation states in Europe, i.e. Hungary, Finland, and Estonia, while a large minority of Mordvins inhabit the federal Mordovian Republic within Russia (Russian Federation).

The indigenous area of the Sámi people is known as Sápmi and it consists of the northern parts of the Fennoscandian Peninsula. Some other peoples that speak Finno-Ugric languages have been assigned formerly autonomous republics within Russia. These are the Karelians (Republic of Karelia), Komi (Komi Republic), Udmurts (Udmurt Republic), Moksha and Erzya (Republica of Mordovia) and Mari (Mari El Republic). The Khanty-Mansi Autonomous Okrug was set up for the Khanty and Mansi of Russia. A once-autonomous Komi-Permyak Okrug was set up for a region of high Komi habitation outside the Komi Republic.

Some of the ethnicities speaking Finno-Ugric languages are:

- Baltic Finns
  - Estonians
  - Finns
  - Izhorians
  - Karelians
  - Livonians
  - Setos
  - Veps
  - Votes
  - Tornedalians
  - Kvens
- Volga Finns
  - Meryans †
  - Meshchyoras†
  - Muromians †
  - Mari
  - Mokshas
  - Erzyas
- Sámi
- Permians
  - Besermyan
  - Komi
  - Udmurts
- Hungarians
  - Székely
  - Csángó
  - Jász
  - Kun
  - Palóc
- Ugrians
  - Khanty
  - Mansi

=== International Finno-Ugric societies ===
Proposed flag of the Finno-Ugric-speaking peoples

In the Finno-Ugric countries of Finland, Estonia and Hungary that find themselves surrounded by speakers of unrelated tongues, language origins and language history have long been relevant to national identity. In 1992, the 1st World Congress of Finno-Ugric Peoples was organized in Syktyvkar in the Komi Republic in Russia, the 2nd World Congress in 1996 in Budapest in Hungary, the 3rd Congress in 2000 in Helsinki in Finland, the 4th Congress in 2004 in Tallinn in Estonia, the 5th Congress in 2008 in Khanty-Mansiysk in Russia, the 6th Congress in 2012 in Siófok in Hungary, the 7th Congress in 2016 in Lahti in Finland, and the 8th Congress in 2021 in Tartu in Estonia. The members of the Finno-Ugric Peoples' Consultative Committee include: the Erzyas, Estonians, Finns, Hungarians, Ingrian Finns, Ingrians, Karelians, Khants, Komis, Mansis, Maris, Mokshas, Nenetses, Permian Komis, Saamis, Tver Karelians, Udmurts, Vepsians; Observers: Livonians, Setos.

In 2007, the 1st Festival of the Finno-Ugric Peoples was hosted by President Vladimir Putin of Russia, and visited by Finnish President, Tarja Halonen, and Hungarian Prime Minister, Ferenc Gyurcsány.

The International Finno-Ugric Students' Conference (IFUSCO) is organised annually by students of Finno-Ugric languages to bring together people from all over the world who are interested in the languages and cultures. The first conference was held in 1984 in Göttingen in Germany. IFUSCO features presentations and workshops on topics such as linguistics, ethnography, history and more.

The International Congress for Finno-Ugric Studies is the largest scientific meeting of scientists studying the culture and languages of Finno-Ugric peoples, held every five years. The first congress was organized in 1960 in Budapest. The last congress took place in 2025 in Tartu, Estonia, and the next congress is planned to be held in Budapest, in 2030.

== See also ==
- Baltic Finnic peoples
- Budinos – International auxiliary language based on Finno-Ugric languages
- Finnic languages
- Volga Finns
- Comb Ceramic culture
- Uralo-Siberian languages
- Old Hungarian script
- Old Permic script
- Pre-Finno-Ugric substrate
- Proto-Finnic language
- Proto-Uralic homeland hypotheses
- International Finno-Ugric Students' Conference
