= Mordvinic languages =

Pair of Uralic languages of Russia

Mordvinic
- Geographic distribution: Southwestern and Southeastern Russia
- Ethnicity: Mordvins
- Native speakers: 275,000 (2021 census)
- Linguistic classification: Uralic: Mordvinic
- Subdivisions: Erzya; Moksha; ?Meshchera †; ?Muromian †

Language codes
- Glottolog: mord1256
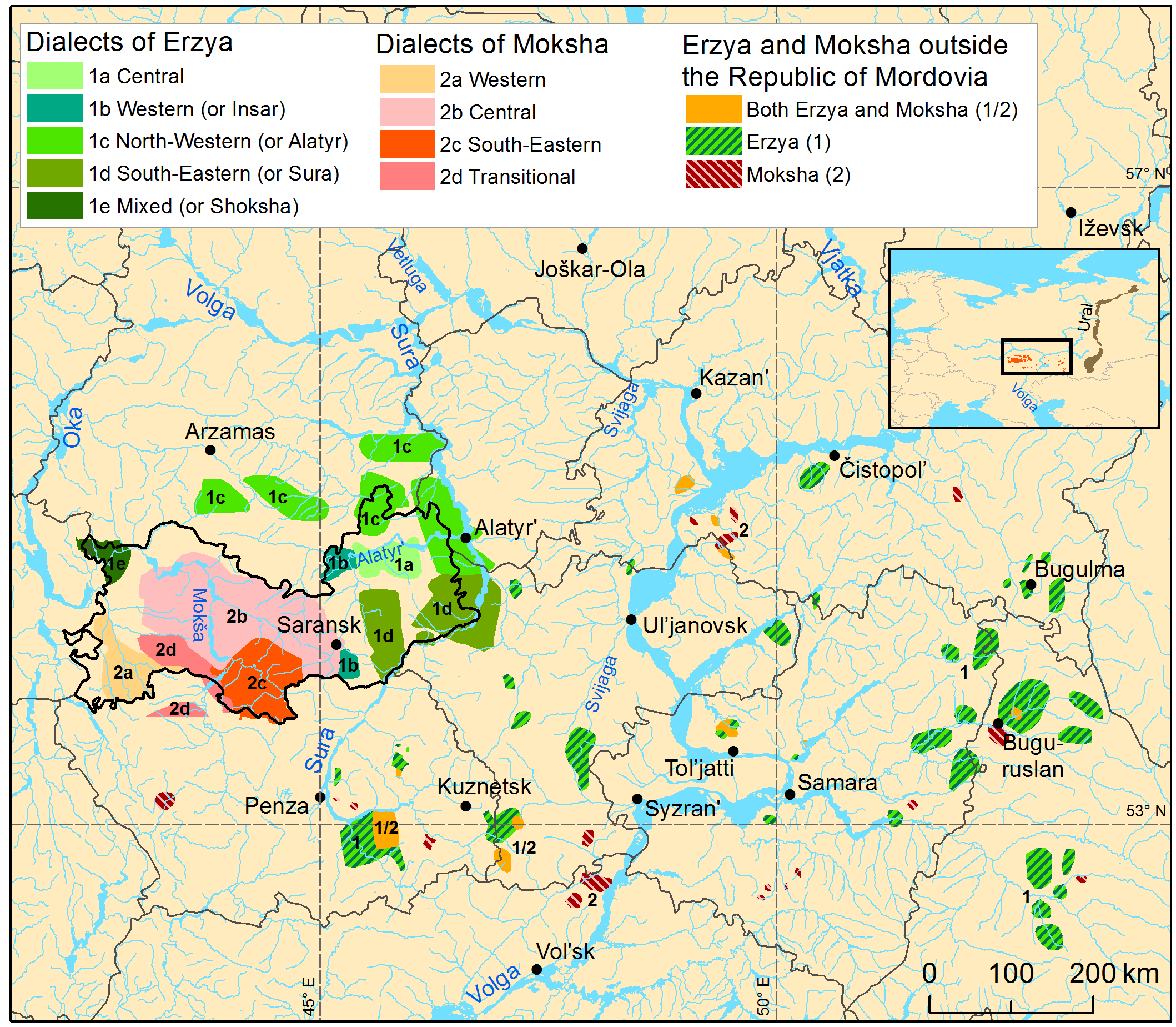
- Mordvin languages at the beginning of the 20th century

The Mordvinic languages, also known as the Mordvin, Mordovian or Mordvinian languages (Russian: мордовские языки, romanized: mordovskiye yazyki), are a subgroup of the Uralic languages, comprising the closely related Erzya language and Moksha language, both spoken in Mordovia.

Previously considered a single "Mordvin language", it is now treated as a small language grouping. Due to differences in phonology, lexicon, and grammar, Erzya and Moksha are not mutually intelligible. The two Mordvinic languages also have separate literary forms. The Erzya literary language was created in 1922 and the Mokshan in 1923.

Phonological differences between the two languages include:

- Moksha retains a distinction between the vowels /ɛ, e/ while in Erzya, they have merged as /e/.
- In unstressed syllables, Erzya features vowel harmony like many other Uralic languages, using [e] in front-vocalic words and [o] in back-vocalic words. Moksha has a simple schwa [ə] in their place.
- Word-initially, Erzya has a postalveolar affricate /tʃ/ corresponding to a fricative /ʃ/ in Moksha.
- Next to voiceless consonants, liquids /r, rʲ, l, lʲ/ and the semivowel /j/ are devoiced in Moksha to [r̥ r̥ʲ l̥ l̥ʲ ȷ̊].

The medieval Meshcherian language may have been Mordvinic or close to Mordvinic.

== Classification ==
Dialects of Moksha and Erzya languages in the Republic of Mordovia Moksha *M-I Central group *M-II Western group *M-III Southeast group Erzya *E-I Central group *E-II Western group *E-III Northwestern group *E-IV Southeast group Shoksha *E-V Shoksha dialect

Traditionally, Uralicists grouped the Mordvinic and Mari languages together in the so-called Volgaic branch of the Uralic family; this view was however abandoned in the late 20th century. Instead, some Uralicists now prefer a rapid expansion model, with Mordvinic as one out of nine primary branches of Uralic; others propose a close relation between Mordvinic with the Finnic and Saamic branches of Uralic.
