= List of states during the Middle Ages =

Post-classical history (also called the post-classical era) is the period of time that immediately followed the end of ancient history. Depending on the continent, the era generally falls between the years AD 200–600 and AD 1200–1500. The name of this era of history derives from classical antiquity (or the Greco-Roman era) of Europe. Though, the everyday context in use is reverse (such as historians reference to Medieval China). In European history, "post-classical" is synonymous with the medieval time or Middle Ages, the period of history from around the 5th century to the 15th century. It began with the collapse of the Western Roman Empire and merged into the Renaissance and the Age of Discovery. The Middle Ages is the middle period of the three traditional divisions of Western history: Antiquity, Medieval period, and Modern period. The Medieval period is itself subdivided into the early, high, and late Middle Ages.

== Europe ==
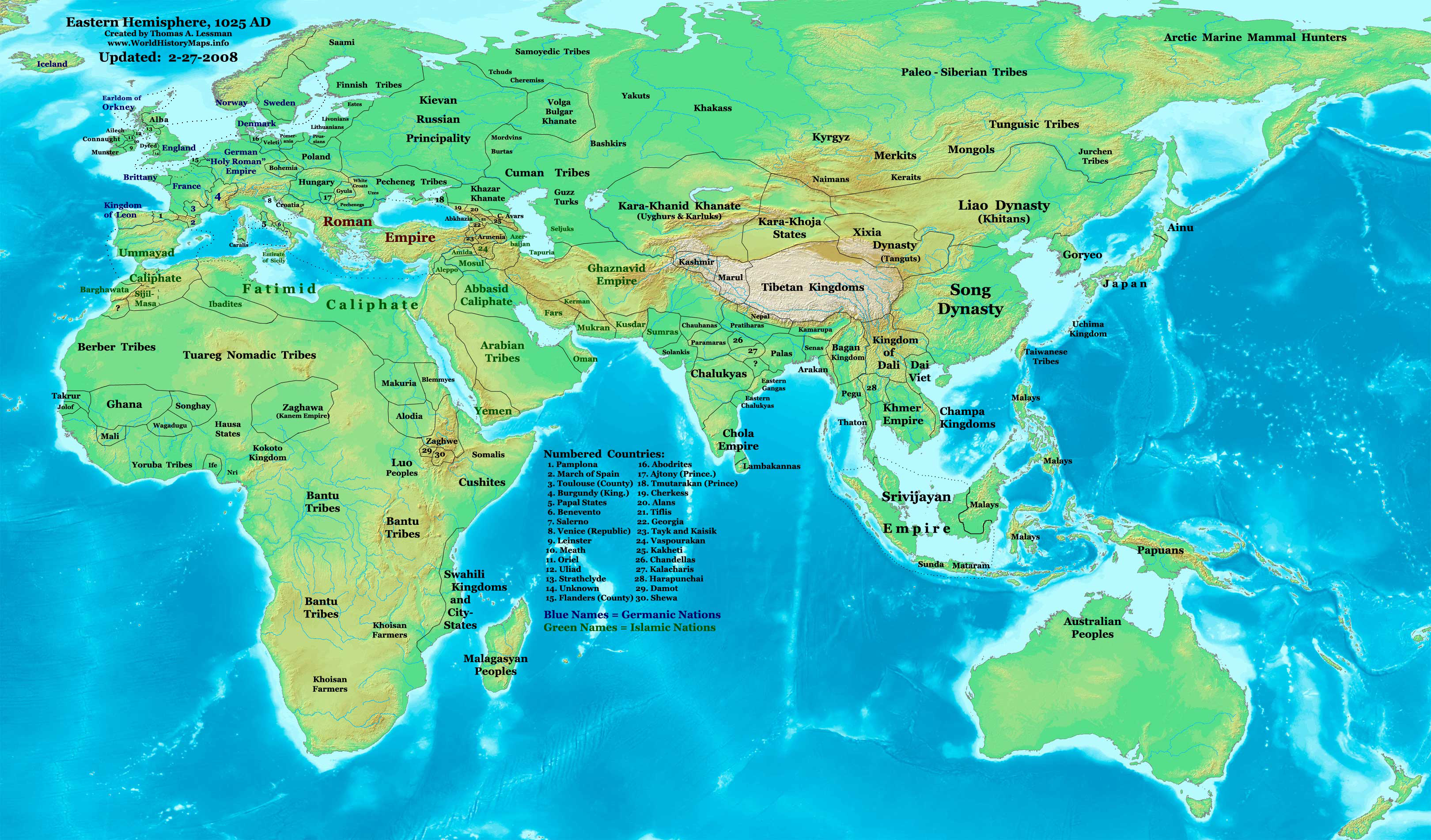
Map of the world in 1025 AD

=== British Isles ===
==== England ====
| Name | Capital | State type | From | To | Flag |
|---|---|---|---|---|---|
| Angevin Empire | no official | empire | 1154 | 1242 | |
| Dumnonia | Isca Dumnoniorum | principality | 360 | 710 | |
| England | Winchester, London | kingdom | 927 | 1707 | |
| East Angles | Rendlesham, Dommoc | kingdom | 6th cent. | 918 | |
| Essex | Rendlesham, Dommoc | kingdom | 527 | 825 | |
| Haestingas | Hastings | tribal kingdom | 6th cent. | 771 | |
| Kent | Durovernum | kingdom | 488 | 871 | |
| Lindsey | Lindum | kingdom/client | 410 | 775 | |
| Mercia | Tamworth | kingdom | 527 | 918 | |
| Northumbria | Bamburgh | kingdom | 653 | 954 | |
| North Sea Empire | Ribe | personal union | 1013 | 1042 | |
| Sussex | Selsey | kingdom | 477 | 825 | |
| Wessex | Winchester | kingdom | 519 | 1018 | |
| Wihtwara | Wihtgarsburgh | kingdom | 512 | 686 | |

==== Scotland ====
| Name | Capital | State type | From | To | Flag |
|---|---|---|---|---|---|
| Alba | Clogher | kingdom | 900 | 1286 | |
| Cait | | tribal kingdom | 25 | 871 | |
| Cé | | tribal kingdom | 1st cent. | 900 | |
| Dal Riada | Dunadd | kingdom | 501 | 878 | |
| Fortriu | | tribal kingdom | 1 | 850 | |
| Galloway | | kingdom | c. 1000 | 1234 | |
| Gododdin | | kingdom | 5th cent. | 8th cent. | |
| Mann and Isles | | kingdom | 848 | 1266 | |
| Moray | | kingdom | c. 970 | 1130 | |
| Pictland | | kingdom | 452 | 850 | |
| Scotland | Stirling, Edinburgh | kingdom | 843 | 1707 | |
| Strathclyde | Dumbarton, Govan | kingdom | 450 | 1093 | Strathclyde |

==== Wales ====
| Name | Capital | State type | From | To | Flag |
|---|---|---|---|---|---|
| Brycheiniog | | kingdom | 450 | 1045 | |
| Deheubarth | Dinefwr | kingdom | 920 | 1197 | |
| Dyfed | | kingdom | 410 | 910 | |
| Glywysing | Cardiff | kingdom | 490 | 1063 | |
| Gwent | Caerwent, Porth-is-Coed | kingdom | 420 | 1081 | |
| Gwynedd | various | kingdom | 420 | 1216 | |
| Powys | various | kingdom | 488 | 1160 | |
| Wales | Aber Garth Celyn | principality | 1216 | 1542 | |

==== Ireland ====
| Name | Capital | State type | From | To | Arms |
|---|---|---|---|---|---|
| Airgíalla | Clogher | tribal federation/kingdom | 331 | 1590 | |
| Brega | | kingdom | 620 | 1013 | |
| Breifne | Croghan | kingdom | 700 | 1256 | |
| Desmond | Killarney | kingdom | 1118 | 1596 | |
| Dublin | Dublin | kingdom | 853 | 1170 | |
| East Breifne | Belturbet, Cavan | kingdom | 1256 | 1607 | |
| Iar Connacht | Dromahair | túatha/kingdom | 1051 | 1589 | |
| Ireland | Dublin | lordship | 1171 | 1542 | |
| Iveagh | | túath | 4th cent. | 1543 | |
| Leinster | | kingdom | 436 | 1632 | |
| Mac William Íochtar | Kilmaine | tanistry | 1330 | 1602 | |
| Meath | Dublin | kingdom | 1st cent. | 1173 | |
| Munster | Cork | kingdom | 1st cent. BC | 1118 AD | |
| Northern Uí Néill | various | kingdom | 420 | 1137 | |
| Ossory | Kilkenny | kingdom | 150 | 1185 | |
| Thomond | Ennis | kingdom | 1118 | 1543 | |
| Tyrconnell | Dun na nGall | kingdom | 464 | 1607 | |
| Uí Failghe | Rathangan, Daingean | kingdom | 507 | 1550 | |
| Uí Fidgenti | Brugh Ríogh | kingdom | 4th cent. | 10th cent. | |
| Uí Liatháin | Castlelyons | kingdom | 4th cent. | 1220 | |
| Uí Mháine | various | túatha | 357 | 1611 | |
| Ulaid | various | kingdom | 400 | 1177 | |
| West Breifne | Dromahair | túatha | 1256 | 1605 | |

=== France/Germany/Austria/Switzerland/Low Countries ===
| Name | Capital | State type | From | To | Flag |
|---|---|---|---|---|---|
| Angevin Empire | no official | empire | 1154 | 1242 | |
| Austrasia | Metz | kingdom | 511 | 751 | |
| Bavaria | | duchy | 508 | 788 | |
| Béarn | various | viscounty | 9th cent. | 1620 | |
| Bouillon | Bouillon | duchy | 1456 | 1794 | |
| Brabant | Brussels | duchy | 1183 | 1430 | |
| Brittany | various | duchy | 939 | 1547 | |
| Burgundy | Dijon | duchy | 1032 | 1477 | |
| Carantania | Karnburg | principality | 658 | 828 | |
| Carolingian Empire | Aachen | empire | 800 | 888 | |
| East Francia | various | kingdom | 843 | 962 | |
| France | Paris, Versailles | kingdom | 843 | 1792 | |
| Frisia | Dorestad, Utrecht | tribal kingdom | 600 | 734 | |
| Frisia (Upstalsboom League) | | confederacy | c. 1200 | c. 1500 | |
| Flanders | various | county | 862 | 1795 | |
| Frankish Empire | Tournai, Paris | kingdom/empire | 481 | 843 | |
| Holland | The Hague | county | 11th cent. | 1795 | |
| Holy Roman Empire see List of states of the Holy Roman Empire | no official | empire | 962 | 1806 | |
| Lorraine | Nancy | duchy | 959 | 1766 | |
| Lotharingia | | kingdom | 855 | 959 | |
| Middle Francia | Aachen | kingdom | 843 | 855 | |
| Normandy | Rouen | duchy | 911 | 1259 | |
| Old Saxony | | duchy | 758 | 804 | |
| Pomerania | various | duchy | 1121 | 1637 | |
| Poher | Vorgium | principality | 520 | 936 | |
| Saxons | | tribal confederation | 5th cent. BC | 754 AD | |
| Swiss Confederacy | various | confederacy | c. 1300 | 1798 | |
| County of Toulouse | Toulouse | county | 778 | 1271 | |
| Terra Mariana | various | confederated bishopric principalities (religious) | 1207 | 1561 | |
| West Francia | Paris | kingdom | 843 | 987 | |

=== Scandinavia ===
| Name | Capital | State type | From | To | Flag |
|---|---|---|---|---|---|
| Denmark | various | kingdom | c. 900 | present | |
| Iceland | Þingvellir | commonwealth (federation) | 930 | 1262 | |
| Kalmar Union | Copenhagen (from 1443) | union | 1397 | 1523 | |
| North Sea Empire | Ribe | personal union | 1013 | 1042 | |
| Kingdom of Norway | various | kingdom | 872 | present | |
| Petty kingdoms of Norway | various | kingdoms | ? | 872 | |
| Sweden | various | kingdom | c. 970 | present | |

=== Balkans ===
| Name | Capital/s | State type | From | To | Flag |
|---|---|---|---|---|---|
| Albania | Durrës | principality | 1328 | 1415 | |
| Achaea | Andravida, Mystras | principality | 1205 | 1432 | |
| Arbanon | Kruja | principality | 1190 | 1255 | |
| Archipelago | Naxos | duchy | 1207 | 1579 | |
| Argos & Nauplia | Nauplia | lordship/client | 1212 | 1388 | |
| Arta | Arta | despotate | 1359 | 1416 | |
| Athens | Athens | duchy | 1205 | 1458 | |
| Bodonitsa | Benevento | marquisate/client | 1204 | 1414 | |
| Kingdom of Bosnia | various | kingdom | 1377 | 1463 | |
| Byzantine Empire | Constantinople | empire | 395 | 1453 | |
| First Bulgarian Empire | Pliska (681–893), Preslav (893–968/972), Skopje, Ohrid, Bitola (until 1018) | empire | 681 | 1018 | |
| Second Bulgarian Empire | Tarnovo (1185–1393) Vidin and Nikopol (1393–1396) | empire | 1185 | 1396 | |
| Emirate of Crete | Chandax | emirate | 824 | 961 | |
| Croatian duchy | various | principality | c. 800 | 925 | |
| Croatia | various | kingdom | 925 | 1102 | |
| Dobruja | Karvuna | despotate | 1356 | 1411 | |
| Duklja | Shkodër | despotate | 10th cent. | 1186 | |
| Latin Empire | Constantinople | empire | 1204 | 1261 | |
| Țara Litua | Câmpulung, Curtea de Argeș | principality | 1241 | 1290 | |
| Despotate of Lovech | Lovech | despotate | 1330 | 1446 | |
| League of Lezhë | | confederacy | 1444 | 1479 | |
| Lower Pannonia | various | principality/client | 839 | 875 | |
| Narentines | | tribal chiefdom/county/duchy | 6th cent. | 10th cent. | |
| Moldavia | Baia/Siret (1343-1388), Suceava (1388-1564) | principality | 1346 | 1859 | |
| Neopatras | Neopatras | duchy | 1319 | 1390 | |
| Lordship of Prilep | Prilep | kingdom | 1371 | 1395 | |
| Ragusa | Ragusa | republic | 1358 | 1807 | |
| Salona | Salona | lordship | 1212 | 1394 | |
| Principality of Serbia | Ras | principality | 7th cent. | c. 970 | |
| Grand Principality of Serbia | Ras | grand principality | c. 1080 | 1217 | |
| Kingdom of Serbia | Ras, Žiča, Prizren | kingdom | 1217 | 1346 | |
| Serbian Empire | Skopje, Prizren | empire | 1346 | 1371 | |
| Principality of Serbia | Kruševac | principality | 1371 | 1402 | |
| Serbian Despotate | Kuševac, Beograd, Smederevo | despotate | 1402 | 1459 | |
| Travunia | Trebinje | principality/client | 850 | 1482 | |
| Thessalonica | Thessalonica | kingdom | 1204 | 1224 | |
| Principality of Valona | Valona | principality | 1346 | 1417 | |
| Vidin | Vidin | tsardom | 1356 | 1365 | |
| Wallachia | Câmpulung, Curtea de Argeș (1330-1418) Târgoviște (1418-1659) | principality | 1290 | 1859 | |

=== Iberia ===
| Name | Capital/s | State type | From | To | Flag |
|---|---|---|---|---|---|
| Aragon | Jaca, Zaragoza | kingdom | 1035 | 1707 | |
| Asturias | various | kingdom | 718 | 924 | |
| Barcelona | Barcelona | county/principality | 801 | 1173 | |
| Castile | various | kingdom | 1230 | 1516 | |
| Catalonia | Barcelona | principality | 1173 | 1714 | |
| Córdoba | Córdoba | emirate | 756 | 929 | |
| Córdoba | Córdoba | caliphate | 929 | 1031 | Abd al-Rahman III of Cordoba |
| Galicia | A Coruña | kingdom | 910 | 1833 | |
| León | León | kingdom | 910 | 1230 | |
| Majorca | Palma, Perpignan | kingdom | 1231 | 1715 | |
| Navarre | Pamplona | kingdom | 824 | 1841 | |
| County of Portugal | Guimarães, Coimbra | kingdom | 868 | 1139 | |
| Portugal | various | kingdom | 1139 | 1910 | |
| Spain | Toledo, Madrid | composite monarchy | 1479 | 1707 | |
| Suebi | Braga | kingdom | 409 | 585 | |
| Taifa | various | confederation of kingdoms/principalities | 1011 | 1571 | |
| Valencia | Valencia | kingdom | 1238 | 1707 | |
| Visigothic | various | kingdom | 418 | 720 | |

=== Italy ===
| Name | Capital/s | State type | From | To | Flag |
|---|---|---|---|---|---|
| Ancona | Ancona | republic | 100 | 1532 | |
| Apulia and Calabria | Malfi, later Salerno | county | 1043 | 1130 | |
| Benevento | Benevento | duchy/principality/client | 571 | 1074 | |
| Capua | Capua | principality | 861 | 1139 | |
| Ceva | Ceva | marquisate | 1125 | 1427 | |
| Republic of Cospaia | Cospaia | republic | 1440 | 1826 | |
| Florence | Florence | republic | 1115 | 1532 | |
| Duchy of Gaeta | Gaeta | duchy | 839 | 1140 | |
| Genoa | Genoa | republic | 1005 | 1797 | |
| Lombard | Pavia | kingdom | 568 | 774 | |
| Lucca | Lucca | republic | 1160 | 1805 | |
| Milan | Milan | duchy | 1395 | 1796 | |
| Naples | Naples | duchy | 661 | 1137 | |
| Republic of Noli | Noli | republic | 1192 | 1797 | |
| Papal | Rome | pontifical states | 754 | 1870 | |
| Republic of Pisa | Pisa | republic | 1000 | 1406 | |
| Salerno | Salerno | principality | 851 | 1077 | |
| San Marino | San Marino | republic | 301 | present | |
| Sardinian kingdoms | various | various kingdoms | 10th cent. | 1420 | |
| Sardinia | Cagliari, Turin | kingdom | 1324 | 1861 | |
| Savoy | Chambeery, later Turin | duchy | 1416 | 1714 | |
| Emirate of Sicily | Balarm | emirate | 831 | 1091 | |
| County of Sicily | Palermo | county | 1071 | 1130 | |
| Kingdom of Sicily | various | kingdom | 1130 | 1816 | |
| Siena | Siena | republic | 1125 | 1555 | |
| Sorrento | Sorrento | duchy | 840 | 1137 | |
| Venice | Venice | republic | 697 | 1797 | |
| Western Roman Empire | Ravenna | empire | 395 | 480 | |

=== Hungary/Poland/Czechoslovakia/Baltics ===
| Name | Capital/s | State type | From | To | Flag |
|---|---|---|---|---|---|
| Avar Khaganate | not specified | khaganate | 567 | 804 | |
| Principality of Hungary | Esztergom, Székesfehérvár | principality | 895 | 1000 | |
| Kingdom of Hungary | various | kingdom | 1000 | 1918 | |
| Duchy of Lithuania | Aukštaitija | duchy | 1009 | 1236 | |
| Grand Duchy of Lithuania | Vilnius | grand duchy | 1236 | 1569 | |
| Livonia | various | confederated bishopric principalities (religious) | 1435 | 1561 | |
| Moravia | Veligrad | kingdom | 833 | 907 | |
| Duchy of Poland | Gniezno | kingdom | 966 | 1025 | |
| Kingdom of Poland | Gniezno, later Cracovia | kingdom | 1025 | 1385 | |
| Crown of the Kingdom of Poland | Krakow | kingdom | 1385 | 1795 | |
| Terra Mariana | various | confederated bishopric principalities (religious) | 1207 | 1561 | |

=== Russia/Ukraine/Belarus ===
| Name | Capital/s | State type | From | To | Flag |
|---|---|---|---|---|---|
| Principality of Beloozero | Beloozero | principality | 1199 | 1550 | |
| Old Great Bulgaria | Phanagoria | absolute monarchy, khaganate | 632 | 668 | |
| Principality of Chernihiv | Chernihiv | principality | 1024 | 1402 | |
| Crimean Khanate | Stary Krym, Bakhchisaray | khanate | 1449 | 1783 | |
| Principality of Dmitrov | Dmitrov | principality | 1338 | 1460 | |
| Galicia–Volhynia | various | principality/kingdom/client | 1199 | 1349 | |
| Principality of Galich | Galich | principality | 1200 | 1481 | |
| Principality of Galicia | Halych | principality | 1124 | 1199 | |
| Principality of Kholm | Kholm | principality | 1330 | 1487 | |
| Kievan Rus' | Kiev | federated principalities | 859 | 1283 | |
| Principality of Kiev | Kiev | principality | 1132 | 1471 | |
| Principality of Mikulin | Mikulin | principality | 1339 | 1485 | |
| Mishar Yurt | Sarov, Kasimov | principality | 13th cent. | 15th cent. | |
| Moscow | Moscow | grand duchy/client | 1283 | 1547 | |
| Mukhsha Ulus | Mukhsha | duchy | 13th cent. | 15th cent. | |
| Principality of Nizhny Novgorod-Suzdal | Nizhny Novgorod | principality | 1341 | 1425 | |
| Novgorod Republic | Novgorod | republic | 1136 | 1478 | |
| Principality of Pereyaslavl | Krakow | kingdom | 988 | 1239/1323 | |
| Great Perm | Perm | principality | 1190 | 1600 | |
| Polotsk | Polotak | principality | 987 | 1504 | |
| Tsardom of Russia | Moscow, Saint Petersburg | tsardom | 1547 | 1721 | |
| Principality of Ryazan | Ryazan | principality | 1129 | 1521 | |
| Principality of Serpukhovsko-Borovsky | Serpukhov | principality | 1338 | 1460 | |
| Principality of Smolensk | Smolensk | principality, vassal state | 1054 | 1508 | |
| Principality of Starodub | Starodub | principality | 1215 | 1451 | |
| Temnikov Principality | Temnikov | principality | 1388 | 1526 | |
| Principality of Tver | Tver | principality | 1246 | 1485 | |
| Principality of Vereya | Vereya | principality | 1400 | 1491 | |
| Vladimir-Suzdal | Vladimir | principality | 1157 | 1331 | |
| Principality of Volhynia | Volhynia | principality | 1157 | 1331 | |
| Principality of Yaroslavl | Yaroslavl | principality | 1217 | 1470 | |

== Middle East and North Africa ==
=== Middle East ===
==== Anatolia ====
See also: List of states in late medieval Anatolia

| Name | Capital | State type | From | To | Flag |
|---|---|---|---|---|---|
| Ahis | Ankara | beylik | 1230 | 1392 | |
| Alaiye | Alanya | beylik | 1293 | 1471 | |
| Aydinids | Birgi, Selçuk | beylik | 1300 | 1425 | |
| Armenian Cilicia | Tarsus, Sis | kingdom | 1198 | 1375 | |
| Arminiya | Dvin | principality/client | 653 | 884 | |
| Byzantine Empire | Constantinople | empire | 330 | 1453 | |
| Beyliks of Canik | various | beylik | 1460 | 1330s | |
| Candar dynasty | Eflani, Kastamonu, Sinop | beylik | 1291 | 1461 | |
| Chobanids | Kastamonu | beylik | 1211 | 1309 | |
| Beylik of Çubukoğulları | Harput | beylik | 1085 | 1112 | |
| Beylik of Dilmaç | Bitlis | beylik | 1085 | 1398 | |
| Beylik of Dulkadir | Elbistan, Maras | beylik | 1348 | 1522 | |
| Germiyanids | Kütahya | beylik | 1300 | 1429 | |
| Hamidids | Eğirdir | beylik | 1300 | 1391 | |
| Inalids | Diyarbakır | beylik | 1085 | 1183 | |
| Karamanids | Karaman | beylik | 1250 | 1487 | |
| Karasids | Balıkesir, Bergama, Çanakkale | beylik | 1286 | 1357 | |
| Kurdish emirates | various | chiefdoms/principalities | 16th cent. | 19th cent. | |
| Beylik of Lâdik | Denizli, | beylik | 1262 | 1391 | |
| Mengujekids | Erzurum | beylik | 1072 | 1277 | |
| Menteshe | Milas | beylik | 1261 | 1424 | |
| Marwanids | Diyarbakir | emirate | 983 | 1085 | |
| Nicaea | Nicaea | empire/client | 1204 | 1261 | |
| Ottoman Empire | Söğüt, Bursa, Edirne, Istanbul | empire | 1299 | 1922 | |
| Pervâneoğlu | Sinop | beylik | 1277 | 1322 | |
| Ramadanid Emirate | Adana | emirate | 1352 | 1608 | |
| Rüm | Nicaea, Iconium | sultanate | 1077 | 1307 | |
| Sahib Ataids | Afyonkarahisar | beylik | 1275 | 1341 | |
| Saltukids | Erzurum | beylik | 1072 | 1202 | |
| Sarukhanids | Manisa | beylik | 1300 | 1510 | |
| Shah-Armens | Ahlat | beylik | 1110 | 1207 | |
| Beylik of Smyrna | Izmir | beylik | 1081 | 1098 | |
| Beylik of Tanrıbermiş | Alaşehir | beylik | 1071 | 1098 | |
| Teke | Antalya, Korkuteli | beylik | 1321 | 1423 | |
| Trebizond Empire | Trebizond | empire/client | 1204 | 1461 | |

==== Arabia ====
| Name | Capital | State type | From | To | Flag |
|---|---|---|---|---|---|
| Abbasid Caliphate | Baghdad | empire (religious) | 750 | 1256 | |
| Ghassanid | Balka, Harith, Petra, Sideir | kingdom | 220 | 712 | |
| Himyar | Zafar,Sanaa | kingdom | 110 BC | 575/578 AD | |
| Jabrids | | emirate | 1417 | 1524 | |
| Jarwanid dynasty | Qatif | kingdom | 1310 | 1417 | |
| Kingdom of Kinda | various,Qaryat al-Faw | kingdom | 450 | 528 | |
| Lakhmid kingdom | Al-Hira | kingdom | 268 | 602 | |
| Mahdids | | sultanate | 1155 | 1174 | |
| Mecca | Mecca | emirate | 967 | 1916 | |
| Medina | Medina | Islamic state | 630 | 632 | |
| Nabhanis | Bahla | kingdom | 1154 | 1624 | |
| Najahid dynasty | Zabid | emirate | 1022 | 1158 | |
| Ormus | Hormuz | kingdom | 1622 | 11th cent. | |
| Ottoman Empire | Söğüt, Bursa, Edirne, Istanbul | empire | 1299 | 1922 | |
| Qarmatians | al-Hasa | republic (utopia) | 899 | 1067 | |
| Rassids | not specified | imamate | 897 | 1962 | |
| Rasulid dynasty | Zubid | sultanate | 1229 | 1454 | |
| Sulaymanids | | sultanate | 1063 | 1174 | |
| Sulayhid dynasty | Sana'a | sultanate | 1047 | 1138 | |
| Tahirids | Zabid | sultanate | 1454 | 1517 | |
| Umayyad Caliphate | Damascus, Harran | empire (religious) | 661 | 750 | |
| Usfurids | Al-Hasa | kingdom | 1253 | 1320 | |
| Uyunid | Al Hasa, Awal, Qatif | emirate | 1076 | 1253 | |
| Wajihids | Suhar | emirate | 926 | 965 | |
| Yu'firids | Sana'a, Shibam Kawkabam | principality | 847 | 997 | |
| Ziyadid | Zabid | emirate (religious) | 819 | 1018 | |
| Zurayids | Aden | tribal confederacy (religious) | 1083 | 1174 | |

==== Iran ====
| Name | Capital | State type | From | To | Flag |
|---|---|---|---|---|---|
| Abbasid Caliphate | Baghdad | empire (religious) | 750 | 1256 | |
| Afrasiyab dynasty | Amol | kingdom | 1349 | 1504 | |
| Ahmadilis | Maragheh | kingdom | 1122 | 1225 | |
| Alavids | Amol | kingdom | 864 | 900 | |
| Alavids | Amol | kingdom | 914 | 928 | |
| Aq Qoyunlu | various | confederate/sultanate | 1378 | 1501 | |
| Baduspanids | | kingdom | 665 | 1598 | |
| Banu Ilyas | Bardsir | emirate | 923 | 968 | |
| Bavand | Perim, Sari, Amol | kingdom | 651 | 1349 | |
| Buwayhids | Shiraz, Ray, Baghdad | emirate | 934 | 1062 | |
| Chobanids | Tebriz | kingdom | 1338 | 1357 | |
| Dabuyid | Amol, Sari, Fuman | kingdom | 642 | 760 | |
| Ghurid | various | sultanate | 879 | 1215 | |
| Hasanwayhids | Dinawar | emirate | 959 | 1015 | |
| Hazaraspids | | chiefdom | 1115 | 1424 | |
| Ilkhanate | Maragha, Tabriz, Soltaniyeh | nomadic kingdom | 1256 | 1335 | |
| Injuids | Shiraz | empire | 1335 | 1357 | |
| Jalayirid Sultanate | Baghdad, Tabriz | sultanate | 1335 | 1432 | |
| Justanids | Rudbar | kingdom | 791 | 11th cent. | |
| Kakuyids | Isfahan, Yazd | kingdom | 1008 | 1141 | |
| Kara Koyunlu | Tabriz | confederation | 1374 | 1468 | |
| Khorshidi dynasty | Khorramabad | kingdom | 1184 | 1497 | |
| Mar'ashis | Anol, Sari, Vatashan | kingdom | 1359 | 1596 | |
| Masmughans of Damavand | Damavand | kingdom | 651 | 760 | |
| Muzaffarids | Kerman | kingdom | 1314 | 1393 | |
| Nizari Ismaili | Alamut Castle, Masyaf | military order | 1090 | 1273 | |
| Qarinvand dynasty | Lafur | kingdom | 550s | 11th cent. | |
| Rawadids | Tabriz | emirate | 955 | 1071 | |
| Sadakiyans | | chiefdom | 770 | 827-828 | |
| Saffarid dynasty | Zaranj | empire | 861 | 1002 | |
| Safavid Iran | Tabriz, Qazvin, Isfahan | empire | 1501 | 1736 | |
| Sajid dynasty | Maragah, Ardabil | kingdom | 789 | 929 | |
| Salghurids | Shiraz | atabegate | 1148 | 1282 | |
| Sallarid dynasty | Tarom | kingdom | 919 | 1062 | |
| Sarbadars | Sabzevar | kingdom | 1337 | 1381 | |
| Sasanian Empire | Istakhr, Cteisphon | empire | 224 | 651 | |
| Seljuk | Nishapur, Rey, Isfahan, Merv, Hamadan | empire | 1037 | 1194 | |
| Umayyad Caliphate | Damascus, Harran | empire (religious) | 661 | 750 | |
| Atabegs of Yazd | Yazd | kingdom | 1141 | 1319 | |
| Ziyarid dynasty | various | kingdom | 931 | 1090 | |

==== Mesopotamia ====
| Name | Capital | State type | From | To | Flag |
|---|---|---|---|---|---|
| Abbasid Caliphate | Baghdad | empire (religious) | 750 | 1256 | |
| Artuqids | Hasankeyf, Diyarbakır, Harput, Mardin | beylik | 1102 | 1409 | |
| Buwayhids | Shiraz, Ray, Baghdad | emirate | 934 | 1062 | |
| Hamdanid | Mosul, Aleppo | emirate | 890 | 1003 | |
| Jalayirid Sultanate | Baghdad, Tabriz | sultanate | 1335 | 1432 | |
| Numayrids | Harran | emirate | 990 | 1081 | |
| Ottoman Empire | Söğüt, Bursa, Edirne, Istanbul | empire | 1299 | 1922 | |
| Sheikhan | Duhok (former), Baadre | principality | c. 13th cent. | present | |
| Uqaylid | Mosul | emirate | 990 | 1096 | |
| Umayyad Caliphate | Damascus, Harran | empire (religious) | 661 | 750 | |
| Zengid | Aleppo | emirate | 1127 | 1250 | |

==== Levantine/Cyprus ====
| Name | Capital | State type | From | To | Flag |
|---|---|---|---|---|---|
| Abbasid Caliphate | Baghdad | empire (religious) | 750 | 1256 | |
| Antioch | Antioch | principality/client | 1098 | 1268 | |
| Assaf | Ghazir | lordship/client | 1306 | 1591 | |
| Banu Ammar | Tripoli | principality/client (religious) | 1070 | 1109 | |
| Cyprus | Nicosia | kingdom | 1192 | 1489 | |
| Edessa | Edessa, Turbessel | county | 1098 | 1150 | |
| Galilee | Tiberias | principality/client | 1099 | 1187 | |
| Harfush | Baalbek | lordship/client | 1490 | 1865 | |
| Jarrahids | Ramla | emirate/client | 970 | 1107 | |
| Jerusalem | Jerusalem | kingdom | 1099 | 1291 | |
| Ma'n | Chouf | lordship/client | 1120 | 1697 | |
| Mirdasid | Aleppo | emirate | 1024 | 1080 | |
| Ottoman Empire | Söğüt, Bursa, Edirne, Istanbul | empire | 1299 | 1922 | |
| Oultrejordain | Montreal (Arabah), Kerak | lordship/client | 1118 | 1199 | |
| Sidon | Sidon | lordship/client | 1110 | 1260 | |
| Tripoli | Tripoli | county/client | 1102 | 1289 | |
| Tulunids | Al-Qata'i | emirate | 868 | 905 | |
| Umayyad Caliphate | Damascus, Harran | empire (religious) | 661 | 750 | |

=== North Africa ===
==== Egypt ====
| Name | Capital | State type | From | To |
|---|---|---|---|---|
| Umayyad Caliphate | Fustat | province | 661 | 750 |
| Abbasid Caliphate | Fustat | province | 750 | 868 |
| Tulunids | Al-Qata'i | emirate | 868 | 905 |
| Ikhshidid | Fustat | emirate | 935 | 969 |
| Fatimid Caliphate | Cairo | nomadic kingdom | 972 | 1171 |
| Banu Kanz | Aswan | empire | 943 | 1365 |
| Ayyubid Sultanate | Cairo | sultanate | 1171 | 1250 |
| Mamluk Sultanate | Cairo | sultanate | 1250 | 1517 |
| Egypt Eyalet | Cairo | province | 1517 | 1805 |

==== Maghreb ====
| Name | Capital | State type | From | To |
|---|---|---|---|---|
| Aghlabids | Kairouan | vassal state | 800 | 909 |
| Almoravid | Aghmat, Marrakesh | empire | 1040 | 1147 |
| Almohad | Tinmel, Marrakesh | empire (religious) | 1121 | 1269 |
| Kingdom of the Aurès | Arris, Khenchela | kingdom | 484 | 703 |
| Banu Khazrun | Tripoli | kingdom | 1001 | 1146 |
| Banu Khattab | Zawila | kingdom | 918 | 1177 |
| Banu Khurasan | Tunis | kingdom | 1108 | 1159 |
| Banu Talis | Bani Walid | emirate | 1258 | 1551 |
| Banu Thabit | Tripoli | kingdom | 14th cent. | 14th cent. |
| Barghawata | | tribal confederation | 744 | 1058 |
| Fatimid Caliphate | Mahdia, Al-Mansuriya, Cairo | empire | 909 | 1171 |
| Hammadid | Beni Hammad, Bejaia | kingdom | 1014 | 1152 |
| Hafsid | Tunis | sultanate | 1229 | 1574 |
| Idrisids | Fez | empire (religious) | 788 | 985 |
| Kingdom of Kuku | Kuku | sultanate | 1515 | 1638 |
| Midrarid dynasty | Sijilmasa | kingdom | 757 | 976 |
| Maghrawa | Oujda | emirate | 988 | 1069 |
| Marinid Sultanate | Fez | sultanate | 1244 | 1465 |
| Nekor | Temsaman, Nekor | emirate | 710 | 1012 |
| Ottoman Empire | Söğüt, Bursa, Edirne, Istanbul | empire | 1299 | 1922 |
| Kingdom of Ouarsenis | Jedars | kingdom | 430 | 735 |
| Rustamid dynasty | Tahert | imamate | 707 | 999 |
| Saadi Sultanate | various | sultanate | 1510 | 1659 |
| Sulaymanid dynasty | Tlemcen | kingdom | 814 | 922 |
| Tlemcen | Tlemcen | kingdom | 1235 | 1554 |
| Emirate of Tlemcen | Tlemcen | emirate | 757 | 790 |
| Umayyad Caliphate | Damascus, Harran | empire (religious) | 661 | 750 |
| Wattasid dynasty | Fez | kingdom | 1472 | 1554 |
| Zab Emirate | Biskra | emirate | 1402 | 1350s |
| Zirid dynasty | various | vassal state | 972 | 1148 |

== Caucasus, Eurasian Steppe and Central Asia ==
=== Caucasus ===
| Name | Capital | State type | Existed | Existed | Flag |
|---|---|---|---|---|---|
| Kingdom of Abkhazia | Anakopia, Kutaisi | kingdom | 778 | 1008 | |
| Principality of Abkhazia | Sukhumi | principality | 1463 | 1864 | |
| Ahmadilis | Maragheh | kingdom | 1122 | 1225 | |
| Alania | Maghas | kingdom | late 9th cent. | 1240 | |
| Kingdom of Artsakh | Khachen, Haterk, Vaykunik | kingdom | 1261 | 1603 | |
| Avaria | Khunzakh | khaganate | 13th cent. | 1864 | |
| Bagratid Armenia | various | kingdom | 880s | 1045 | |
| Circassia | various | kingdom | 7th cent. | 1864 | |
| Eldiguzids | Nakhchivan | atabeg | 1126 | 1245 | |
| Georgia | Kutaisi, Tbilisi | kingdom | 1008 | 1491 | |
| Iberia | Tbilisi | principality | 580 | 891 | |
| Kingdom of Kakheti | Gremi | kingdom | 1465 | 1762 | |
| Kingdom of Kakheti-Hereti | Telavi | kingdom | 1014 | 1104 | |
| Karluk Yabghu | Suyab, later Balasagun | tribal kingdom | 756 | 840 | |
| Kingdom of Kartli | Tbilisi | kingdom | 1478 | 1762 | |
| Principality of Khachen | Gandzasar, Haterk, Tsar | principality | 1261 | 1603 | |
| Lazica | Phasis | kingdom/client | 1st cent. BC | 7th cent. AD | |
| Shirvanshahs | Shamakhi, later Baku | kingdom | 861 | 1534 | |
| Simsim | | kingdom | 1349 | 1470 | |
| Sarir | Humraj | kingdom/client | 453 | 1000 | |
| Tarki Shamkhalate | Tarki | kingdom | 8th cent. | 1867 | |
| Kingdom of Syunik | Kapan | kingdom | 987 | 1170 | |
| Kingdom of Tashir-Dzoraget | Matsnaberd, Lori | kingdom | 979 | 1118 | |
| Kingdom of Vaspurakan | Van | kingdom | 908 | 1021 | |
| Zakarid Armenia | Van | kingdom | 1201 | 1350 | |

=== Eurasian Steppe ===
| Name | Capital | State type | Existed | Existed | Flag |
|---|---|---|---|---|---|
| Astrakhan Khanate | Astrakhan | khaganate | 1466 | 1556 | |
| Avar Khaganate | | khaganate | 567 | 804 | |
| Barsil | | tribal union | 600 | 700 | |
| Old Great Bulgaria | Phanagoria | absolute monarchy, khaganate | 632 | 668 | |
| Volga Bulgaria | Bolghar, Bilär | monarchy, khaganate | 7th cent. | 1240s | |
| Chagatai Khanate | Almaliq | nomadic empire | 1226 | 1660 | |
| Cumania | not specified | nomadic confederation | 900 | 1220 | |
| Eastern Turkic Khaganate | Otuken | nomadic empire | 603 | 645 | |
| Ganzhou Uyghur Kingdom | Ganzhou | kingdom | 894 | 1038 | |
| Göktürk Khaganate | Ordu Baliq | nomadic confederation | 552 | 747 | |
| Golden Horde | Sarai Batu | khanate | 1240 | 1502 | |
| Karluk Yabghu | Suyab, later Balasagun | tribal kingdom | 756 | 840 | |
| Kangar union | located in Ulutau mountains | nomadic kingdom | 659 | 750 | |
| Khanate of Kazan | Kazan | khanate | 1438 | 1552 | |
| Khamag Mongol | | tribal confederation/khanate | 1120 | 1206 | |
| Kara-Khanid Khanate | various | nomadic confederation | 840 | 1212 | |
| Khazar Khaganate | various | nomadic kingdom | 618 | 1048 | |
| Khitan | Shangjing | kingdom/client | 388 | 1211 | |
| Kimek–Kipchak confederation | Imekia | tribal confederation | 880 | 1035 | |
| Principality of Kod | Shorkar | principality | 15th cent. | 1643 | |
| Moghulistan | Almaliq | khaganate | 1347 | 1660s | |
| Mongol Empire | various | empire | 1206 | 1368 | |
| Nogai Horde | Saray-Jük | horde | 1440s | 1634 | |
| Northern Yuan | Shangdu | kingdom | 1368 | 1635 | |
| Principality of Obdorsk | Pulvonat-vosh/Obdorsk/Salekhard | principality | 14th cent. | 1609 | |
| Oghuz Yabgu State | Jankent | khaganate | 766 | 1055 | |
| Oirat Confederation | Tarki | tribal confederation | 1399 | 1634 | |
| Qocho Kingdom | Qocho | kingdom | 843 | 14th cent. | |
| Second Turkic Khaganate | Otuken, Yarγan yurtï | nomadic empire | 682 | 744 | |
| Khanate of Sibir | Sibir | khaganate | 1468 | 1598 | |
| Tatar | not specified | confederation | 8th cent. | 1202 | |
| Uyghur Khaganate | Otuken, later Ordu-Baliq | nomadic empire | 744 | 840 | |
| Western Turkic Khaganate | Navekat, Suyub | nomadic empire | 603 | 742 | |
| Xueyantuo | Ih Huree | tribal confederation | 623 | 728 | |
| Yenisei Kyrgyz Khaganate | Ordo-Baliq, Kemijket | khaganate | 693 | 1207 | |
| Yuan Empire | Khanbaliq | nomadic empire | 1271 | 1368 | |

=== Central Asia ===
| Name | Capital | State type | Existed | Existed | Flag |
|---|---|---|---|---|---|
| Afrighid | Kath | kingdom/client | 305 | 995 | |
| Farighunids | Maymana | client kingdom | 9th cent. | 1010 | |
| Ghaznavids Empire | Ghazni, later Lahore | empire | 977 | 1186 | |
| Ghurid | various | sultanate | 879 | 1215 | |
| Guzgan | | principality | 7th cent. | 8th cent. | |
| Kashgar | Kashgar | kingdom/client | 80 | 850 | |
| Khotan | Khotan | kingdom | 56 | 1006 | |
| Khwarazmian Empire | Gurgani, Samarkand, Tabriz | empire | 1077 | 1231 | |
| Mihrabanids | Zaranj | kingdom | 1236 | 1537 | |
| Nasrid dynasty | Zaranj | kingdom | 1029 | 1225 | |
| Samanid Empire | Samarkand, later Bukhara | empire | 819 | 999 | |
| Timurid Empire | Samarkand, Herat | empire | 1370 | 1507 | |
| Tokhara Yabghus | Kunduz | sub-kingdom | 625 | 758 | |
| Principality of Ushrusana | Bunjikat | principality | 600 | 892/3 | |
| Uzbek Khanate | Chimgi-Tura, Sighnaq, Isay | confederate khaganate | 1428 | 1471 | |
| Zunbils | Ghazni | nomadic empire | 680 | 870 | |

== East Asia ==
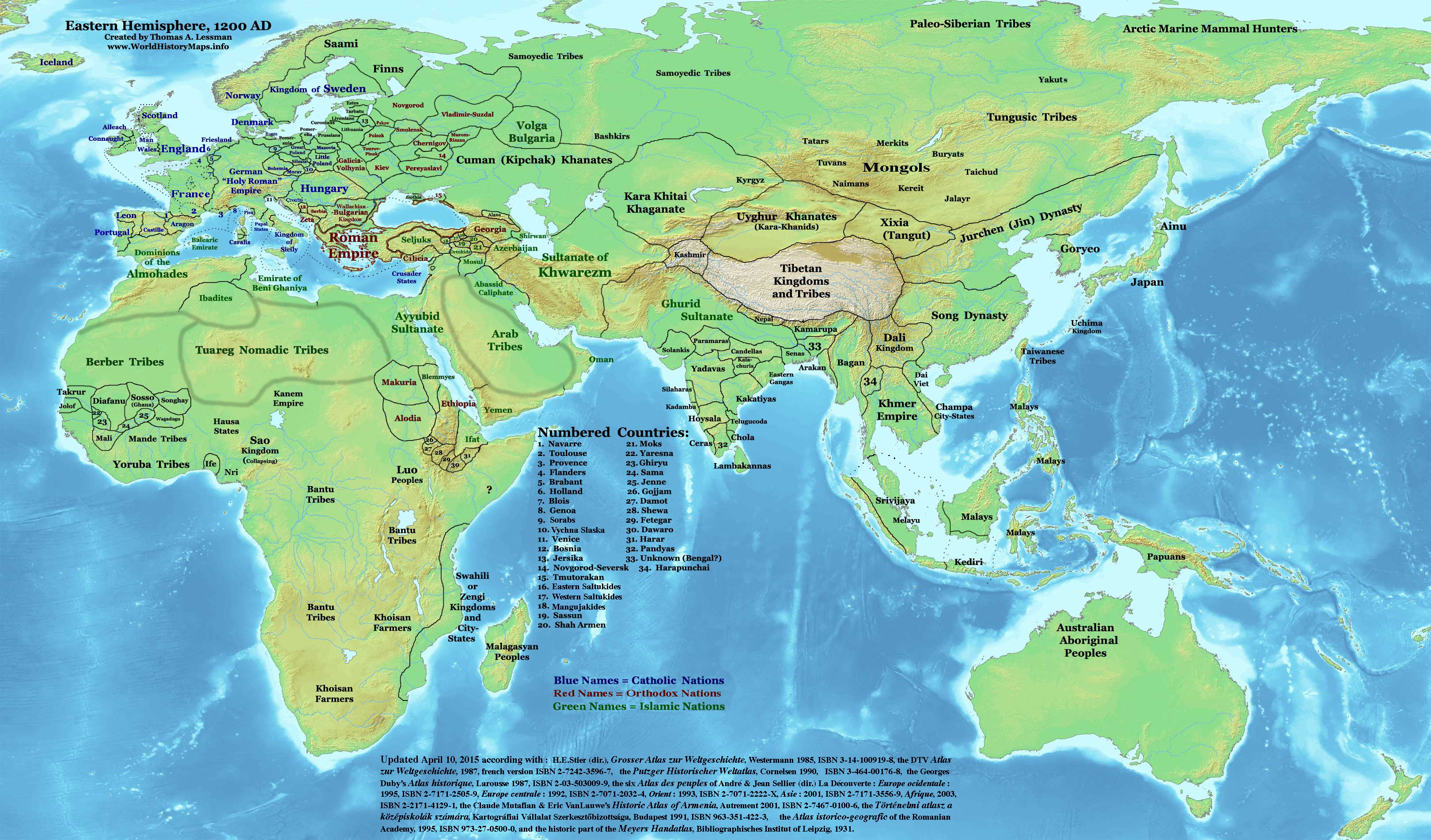
Map of the world 13th century AD

=== China ===
| Name | Capital | State type | From | To | Flag |
|---|---|---|---|---|---|
| Dali Kingdom | Dali Town | chiefdom | 937 | 1253 | |
| Dachanghe | Dali | chiefdom | 902 | 928 | |
| Eastern Liao | | kingdom | 1213 | 1269 | |
| Eastern Xia | Kaiyuan | kingdom | 1215 | 1233 | |
| Later Han | Kaifeng | kingdom | 947 | 951 | |
| Northern Han | Taiyuan | kingdom | 951 | 979 | |
| Great Jin | various | empire | 1115 | 1254 | |
| Later Jin | Kaifeng | kingdom | 936 | 947 | |
| Later Liang | Luoyang, Kaifeng | kingdom | 907 | 23 | |
| Ma Chu | Changsha | kingdom | 908 | 951 | |
| Middag | Middag | kingdom | ? | 17th cent. | |
| Min | Changle | kingdom | 909 | 945 | |
| Mongol Empire | Avarga, Karakorum, Dadu | empire | 1206 | 1368 | |
| Former Shu | Chengdu | kingdom | 907 | 925 | |
| Later Shu | Chengdu | kingdom | 934 | 965 | |
| Chiefdom of Sizhou | Sizhou | chiefdom | 582 | 1413 | |
| Song Empire | Bianjing, Lin'an | empire | 960 | 1279 | |
| Southern Han | Xingwang Fu | kingdom | 917 | 971 | |
| Tang Empire | Chang'an, Luoyang | empire | 618 | 907 | |
| Later Tang | Luoyang, Kaifeng | kingdom | 923 | 937 | |
| Southern Tang | Jinling | kingdom | 937 | 976 | |
| Western Xia | Xingqing | kingdom | 1038 | 1237 | |
| Wuyue | Qiantang | kingdom | 907 | 978 | |
| Yang Wu | Yangzhou | kingdom | 907 | 937 | |
| Yuan Empire | Khanbaliq | nomadic empire | 1271 | 1368 | |
| Later Zhou | Kaifeng | kingdom | 951 | 960 | |

=== Japan ===
| Name | Capital | State type | From | To | Flag |
|---|---|---|---|---|---|
| Ashikaga shogunate | Heian-kyō | military regime | 1336 | 1573 | |
| Azuchi–Momoyama | Azuchi, Heian-kyō | military regime | 1568 | 1600 | |
| Chūzan | Urasoe | kingdom | 1314 | 1429 | |
| Hokuzan | Nakijin | kingdom | 1322 | 1466 | |
| Ikkō-ikki | Ishiyama Hongan-ji | military confederacy | 1457 | 1586 | |
| Japan | | kingdom | 4th cent. | 7th cent. | |
| Kamakura shogunate | Kamakura-kyō, Heian-kyō | military regime | 1192 | 1333 | |
| Ryukyu | Shuri | kingdom | 1429 | 1879 | |

=== Korea ===
| Name | Capital | State type | From | To | Flag |
|---|---|---|---|---|---|
| Later Baekje | Wansanju | kingdom | 892 | 936 | |
| Balhae Empire | Dongmo | empire | 698 | 926 | |
| Goryeo | Gaegyeong | kingdom | 918 | 1392 | |
| Jeongan | | kingdom | 938 | 986 | |
| Silla | Gyeongju | kingdom | 55 BC | 935 AD | |
| Tamna | | kingdom | ? | 1404 | |
| Taebong | Somgak, Cheorwon | kingdom | 901 | 918 | |
| Usan | | kingdom | 512 | 930 | |

=== Tibet ===
| Name | Capital | State type | From | To | Flag |
|---|---|---|---|---|---|
| Kingdom of Derge | Derge | kingdom | 13th cent. | 1956 | |
| Guge | Tsaparang | kingdom | 910 | 1630 | |
| Khasa Kingdom | Sinja Valley | kingdom | 11th cent. | 14th cent. | |
| Maryul | Shey | kingdom | 930 | 1842 | |
| Maqpon dynasty | Skardu | kingdom | c. 1190 | 1840 | |
| Phagmodrupa dynasty | Nedong | kingdom | 1354 | 1618 | |
| Rinpungpa | Shigatse | kingdom | 1435 | 1565 | |
| Tibetan Empire | Lhasa, Pho brang | empire | 618 | 841 | |
| Tsangpa | Shigatse | theocracy | 1565 | 1642 | |
| Tsongkha | Tsongkha | theocracy | 997 | 1104 | |
| Xiliangfu | Liangzhou | tribal confederation | 906 | 1016 | |

== Southeast Asia ==
=== Burma ===
| Name | Capital | State type | From | To | Flag |
|---|---|---|---|---|---|
| Kingdom of Ava | Ava | kingdom | 1365 | 1555 | |
| Hanthawaddy kingdom | various | kingdom | 1287 | 1552 | |
| Kingdom of Mrauk U | Mrauk U | kingdom | 1430 | 1785 | |
| Myinsaing Kingdom | Myinsaing | kingdom | 1237 | 1313 | |
| Pagan Kingdom | Pagan | kingdom | 849 | 1297 | |
| Pinya Kingdom | Pinya | kingdom | 1313 | 1365 | |
| Prome Kingdom | Nanzan | kingdom | 1482 | 1542 | |
| Pyu | Sri Ksetra | federated city states | 250 BC | 1085 AD | |
| Sagaing Kingdom | Sagaing | kingdom | 1315 | 1365 | |
| Shan States | various | kingdoms | 1215 | 1985 | |
| Thaton | Thaton | kingdom | 300 BC | 1085 AD | |
| Toungoo dynasty | Toungoo, Pegu, Ava | kingdom | 1510 | 1752 | |
| Möng Mao Lông | Selan | kingdom | 1335 | 1444 | |

=== Cambodia/Laos/Thailand ===
| Name | Capital | State type | From | To | Flag |
|---|---|---|---|---|---|
| Dvaravati | Si Thep, Ayodhyapura, Mueang Uthong | kingdom | 629 | 1292 | |
| Haripuñjaya | Haripuñjaya | kingdom | 629 | 1292 | |
| Khmer Empire | Angkor | empire | 802 | 1431 | |
| Lan Na | Chiang Rai, Fang, Wiang Kum Kam, Chiang Mai | kingdom | 1292 | 1775 | |
| Lavo | Lavo, Ayodhaya | kingdom | 450 | 1388 | |
| Lan Xang | Luang Prabang, later Vientiane | kingdom | 1353 | 1707 | |
| Nakhon Si Thammarat Kingdom | Nakhon Si Thammarat | kingdom | 13th cent. | 1782 | |
| Ngoenyang | Ngoenyang | kingdom | 638 | 1292 | |
| Phayao Kingdom | Phayao | kingdom | 1094 | 1338 | |
| Sukhothai Kingdom | Sukhothai, Song Khwae | kingdom | 1238 | 1438 | |

=== Vietnam ===
| Name | Capital | State type | From | To | Flag |
|---|---|---|---|---|---|
| Đại Việt / Annam | Thăng Long | kingdom | 938 | 1400 | |
| Đại Việt / Annam | Thăng Long | kingdom | 1428 | 1804 | |
| Đại Ngu | Tây Đô | kingdom | 1400 | 1407 | |
| Ngưu Hống | Murong Moi | kingdom | 1000 | 1432 | |
| Vạn Xuân | Longbian | kingdom | 544 | 603 | |

=== Indonesia/Malaysia ===
| Name | Capital | State type | From | To | Flag |
|---|---|---|---|---|---|
| Aru Kingdom | Kota Rentang | kingdom | 1225 | 1613 | |
| Bali Kingdom | Bali | kingdom | 914 | 1908 | |
| Blambangan Kingdom | Banyuwangi | kingdom | 13th cent. | 18th cent. | |
| Bruneian Empire | various | empire | 7th cent. | 19th cent. | |
| Sultanate of Cirebon | various | sultanate | 1447 | 1679 | |
| Demak Sultanate | Demak | sultanate | 1475 | 1554 | |
| Galuh Kingdom | Kawali | kingdom | 669 | 1482 | |
| Sultanate of Jailolo | Jailolo | sultanate | 13th cent. | 1832 | |
| Janggala | Hujung Galuh | kingdom | 1045 | 1135 | |
| Kahuripan | Kahuripan | kingdom | 1019 | 1045 | |
| Kalingga Kingdom | | kingdom | 6th cent. | 7th cent. | |
| Kalinyamat Sultanate | Kalinyamat | sultanate | 1527 | 1599 | |
| Kantoli | Kantoli | kingdom | ? | 471 AD | |
| Kedah | Kedah city | kingdom, later sultanate | 330 | present | |
| Kediri Kingdom | Dahanapura | kingdom | 1042 | 1222 | |
| Kutai | | kingdom, later sultanate | 399 | 1844 | |
| Lambri | | kingdom | 822 | 1503 | |
| Langkasuka | Kedah, Pattani | kingdom | 100 | 1516 | |
| Kingdom of Maynila | Maynila | kingdom | 1500 | 1571 | |
| Majapahit | Trowulan | empire | 1293 | 1527 | |
| Malacca Sultanate | Malacca | sultanate | 1400 | 1528 | |
| Mataram kingdom | various | kingdom | 716 | 1016 | |
| Mataram Sultanate | Kota Gede, Karta, Plered, Kartosuro | sultanate | 1586 | 1755 | |
| Negara Daha | | kingdom | ? | ? | |
| Pahang | Inderapura | kingdom | 5th cent. | 1454 | |
| Kingdom of Pajang | Pajang | kingdom | 1568 | 1586 | |
| Pannai | Pannai | kingdom | 11th cent. | 14th cent. | |
| Pan Pan | ? | kingdom | 300 | 700 | |
| Segati Kingdom | various | kingdom | 15th cent. | 16th cent. | |
| Samudera Pasai Sultanate | Pasai | sultanate | 1267 | 1524 | |
| Singhasari | Tumapel | kingdom | 1222 | 1292 | |
| Kingdom of Singapura | Singapura | kingdom | 1299 | 1398 | |
| Srivijaya | Palembang | kingdom | 671 | 1025 | |
| Sulu | various | sultanate/client | 1405 | 1915 | |
| Sunda | Pakuan Pajajaran, Kawali | kingdom | 669 | 1579 | |

=== Philippines ===
| Name | Capital | State type | From | To | Flag |
|---|---|---|---|---|---|
| Caboloan | Binalatongan | kingdom | 1225 | 1556 | |
| Cebu | Singhapala | kingdom | 1400 | 1565 | |
| Dapitan Kingdom | Dapitan | kingdom | 13th cent. | 1595 | |
| Kumalarang | | kingdom | 13th cent. | 1565 | |
| Madya-as | | confederation | 1200 | 1569 | |
| Kingdom of Maynila | Maynila | kingdom | 1500 | 1571 | |
| Ma-i | | kingdom | 971 | 1339 | |
| Namayan | Namayan | kingdom | (before) 1175 | 1571 | |
| Tondo Empire | Tondo | city state | 900 | 1589 | |

== South Asia ==
| Name | Capital | State type | From | To | Flag |
|---|---|---|---|---|---|
| Ahmadnagar Sultanate | various | sultanate | 1490 | 1636 | |
| Alupa dynasty | various | kingdom | 200 | 1444 | |
| Ay | Aykudi | kingdom | 4th cent. BC | 12th cent. AD | |
| Bhauma-Kara dynasty | Jajpur | kingdom | 8th cent. | 10th cent. | |
| Bahmani | Gulbarga, Bidar | sultanate | 1347 | 1527 | |
| Baise Rajya | various | confederation of kingdoms | ? | 1744 | |
| Bengal Sultanate | Pandua, Sonargaon, Gaur | sultanate | 1352 | 1576 | |
| Berar Sultanate | Ellichpur | sultanate | 1490 | 1572 | |
| Bidar Sultanate | Bidar | sultanate | 1492 | 1619 | |
| Bijapur Sultanate | Gulbarga, Bidar | sultanate | 1490 | 1686 | |
| Bumthang | Chakhar Gutho | kingdom | 7th cent. | 17th cent. | |
| Chanda | Bhutamabilika | kingdom | 807 | 1751 | |
| Chaubisi Rajya | various | confederation of principalities | ? | 1744 | |
| Chavda dynasty | Panchaser | kingdom | 690 | 942 | |
| Chero dynasty | various | kingdom | 12th cent. | 19th cent. | |
| Chindaka Naga | Barasur | kingdom | 1023 | 1324 | |
| Chowta dynasty | various | kingdom | 12th cent. | 18th cent. | |
| Cochin | various | kingdom | 12th cent. | 1947 | |
| Chahamanas of Shakambhari | Shakambhari, Ajayameru | kingdom | 6th cent. | 1192 | |
| Eastern Chalukya | Vengi, Rajamundry | kingdom | 624 | 1129 | |
| Chudasama dynasty | various | kingdom | 10th cent. | 1472 | |
| Chutia Kingdom | Sadiya | kingdom | 14th cent. | 1524 | |
| Delhi Sultanate | Delhi | empire | 1206 | 1526 | |
| Deva dynasty | Bikrampur | kingdom | 12th cent. | 13th cent. | |
| Dimasa Kingdom | various | kingdom | 13th cent. | 1832 | |
| Gahadavala dynasty | Banaras and Kannauj | kingdom | 1089 | 1197 | |
| Gajapati Empire | Cuttack | empire | 1434 | 1541 | |
| Garha Kingdom | Garha | kingdom | 15th cent. | 1781 | |
| Garhwal | various | kingdom | 888 | 1949 | |
| Golconda Sultanate | Golconda, Hyderabad | sultanate | 1518 | 1687 | |
| Gurjara Pratihara Empire | Kannauj | empire | 650 | 1036 | |
| Kingdom of Gujarat | Patan, Gujarat | kingdom | 941 | 1298 | |
| Gujarat Sultanate | Ahmedabad | sultanate | 1394 | 1573 | |
| Habbari Emirate | Mansura | empire | 854 | 1011 | |
| Haihaiyavanshi Kingdom | Rayapura | kingdom | 14th cent. | 1758 | |
| Hoysala Empire | Sosavur, Belur, Halebidu | empire | 1026 | 1343 | |
| Jaintia Kingdom | Nartiang, Jaintiapur | kingdom | 500 | 1835 | |
| Jaunpur Sultanate | Jaunpur | sultanate | 1394 | 1493 | |
| Kakatiya dynasty | Orugallu | empire | 1163 | 1323 | |
| Kalachuris of Sarayupara | | kingdom | 800 | 1080 | |
| Kalachuris of Tripuri | Tripuri | kingdom | 7th cent. | 1212 | |
| Kalachuri dynasty | Mahishmati | kingdom | 550 | 625 | |
| Kalachuris of Kalyani | Kalyani | kingdom | 1164 | 1181 | |
| Kalachuris of Ratnapura | Ratanpur | kingdom | 11th cent. | 1758 | |
| Kamarupa | Pragjyotishpur, Haruppeswara, Durjaya | kingdom | 350 | 1140 | |
| Kamata Kingdom | Kamarupanagara | kingdom | 1257 | 1587 | |
| Kampili kingdom | | kingdom | 1230 | 1886 | |
| Karnat dynasty | various | kingdom | 1097 | 1324 | |
| Karkota dynasty | | kingdom | 625 | 855 | |
| Kashmir Sultanate | Srinagar | sultanate | 1320 | 1589 | |
| Later Gupta dynasty | Pataliputra | kingdom | 490 | 750 | |
| Nayakas of Keladi | Keladi, Ikkeri, Bidanur | kingdom | 1499 | 1763 | |
| Khandesh Sultanate | | sultanate | 1382 | 1601 | |
| Khasa Kingdom | Sinja Valley | empire | 11th cent. | 14th cent. | |
| Kolathunadu | various | kingdom | 6th cent. BC | present | |
| Kumaon Kingdom | Baijnath, Champawat, Almora | kingdom | 600 | 1791 | |
| Langah Sultanate | Multan | sultanate | 1445 | 1540 | |
| Licchavi | | kingdom | 400 | 750 | |
| Limbuwan | | various kingdoms | 550 | 1609 | |
| Lohara dynasty | Srinagar | kingdom | 1003 | 1320 | |
| Malwa Kingdom | Dhar | kingdom | 947 | 1304 | |
| Malwa Sultanate | Dhar | sultanate | 1392 | 1562 | |
| Madurai Sultanate | Madurai | sultanate | 1335 | 1378 | |
| Mallabhum kingdom | Laugram, Bishnupur | kingdom | 694 | 1947 | |
| Malla dynasty | various | kingdoms | 1201 | 1769 | |
| Mana dynasty | Wairagarh | kingdom | 650 | 850 | |
| Maukhari Empire | Kannauj | empire | 550 | 700 | |
| Madurai Nayak dynasty | Madurai | kingdom | 1529 | 1736 | |
| Emirate of Multan | Multan | empire | 855 | 1010 | |
| Musunuri Nayakas | Warangal | kingdom | 1335 | 1358 | |
| Mysore | Mysore, Srirangapatna | kingdom | 1399 | 1947 | |
| Namgyal dynasty of Ladakh | Leh | kingdom | 1460 | 1842 | |
| Nagvanshis of Chotanagpur | various | chiefdom | 4th cent. | 1952 | |
| Odanad | Mavelikkara, Kayamkulam | sultanate | 11th cent. | 1746 | |
| Oiniwar dynasty | Sugauna | kingdom | 1325 | 1526 | |
| Pala Empire | various | empire | 750 | 1161 | |
| Pallava Empire | Kanchi | empire | 250 BC | 800 AD | |
| Pamduvamshis | Sirpur | kingdom | 7th cent. | 8th cent. | |
| Pithipatis of Bodh Gaya | Bodh Gaya | kingdom | 11th cent. | 13th cent. | |
| Pratapgarh Kingdom | Patharkandi | kingdom | 1489 | 1700s | |
| Rashtrakuta dynasty | Manyakheta | kingdom | 753 | 982 | |
| Reddi Kingdom | Addanki | kingdom | 1325 | 1448 | |
| Saindhava | Bhutamabilika | kingdom | 735 | 920 | |
| Sambuvarayar | Rajagambhiram | kingdom | 1236 | 1375 | |
| Sena Empire | Gauda, Bikrampur, Nabadwip, Lakhnauti, Vijaynagar | empire | 1070 | 1230 | |
| Seuna dynasty | Devagiri | kingdom | 1187 | 1317 | |
| Shailodbhava dynasty | | kingdom | 6th cent. | 8th cent. | |
| Shilahara Kingdom | Thane | kingdom | 8th cent. | 13th cent. | |
| Sindh | Aror | kingdom | 632 | 712 | |
| Somavamshi dynasty | Yayatinagara | kingdom | 9th cent. | 12th cent. | |
| Taraf | Rajpur, later Laskarpur | kingdom | 1200 | 1610 | |
| Tomara dynasty | Anangpur | kingdom | 736 | 1152 | |
| Utpala dynasty | Awantipora | kingdom | 855 | 1003 | |
| Vaghela dynasty | Dhavalakka | kingdom | 1244 | 1304 | |
| Venad Kingdom | Quilon | kingdom | 8/9th cent. | 1729 | |
| Vijayanagara Empire | Vijayanagara | empire | 1336 | 1646 | |
| Western Ganga | Kolar, Talakad | kingdom | 350 | 1000 | |
| Western Chalukya Empire | Manyakheta | empire | 975 | 1184 | |
| Yajvapala dynasty | | kingdom | 13th cent. | 13th cent. | |
| Zamorin | Calicut | kingdom | 1124 | 1806 | |

=== Sri Lanka ===
| Name | Capital | State type | From | To | Flag |
|---|---|---|---|---|---|
| Kingdom of Anuradhapura | Anuradhapura | kingdom | 377 BC | 1017 AD | |
| Kingdom of Dambadeniya | Dambadeniya | kingdom | 1220 | 1345 | |
| Kingdom of Gampola | Gampola | kingdom | 1341 | 1408 | |
| Kingdom of Jaffna | Nallur | kingdom | 1215 | 1619 | |
| Kingdom of Kandy | Kandy | kingdom | 1469 | 1815 | |
| Kingdom of Kotte | Kotte | kingdom | 1412 | 1597 | |
| Kingdom of Polonnaruwa | Vijayarajapura | kingdom | 1055 | 1232 | |
| Kingdom of Raigama | Raigampura | kingdom | 1391 | 1412 | |
| Vanni chieftaincies | | chiefdom | 13th cent. | 1782 | |

== Sub-Saharan Africa ==
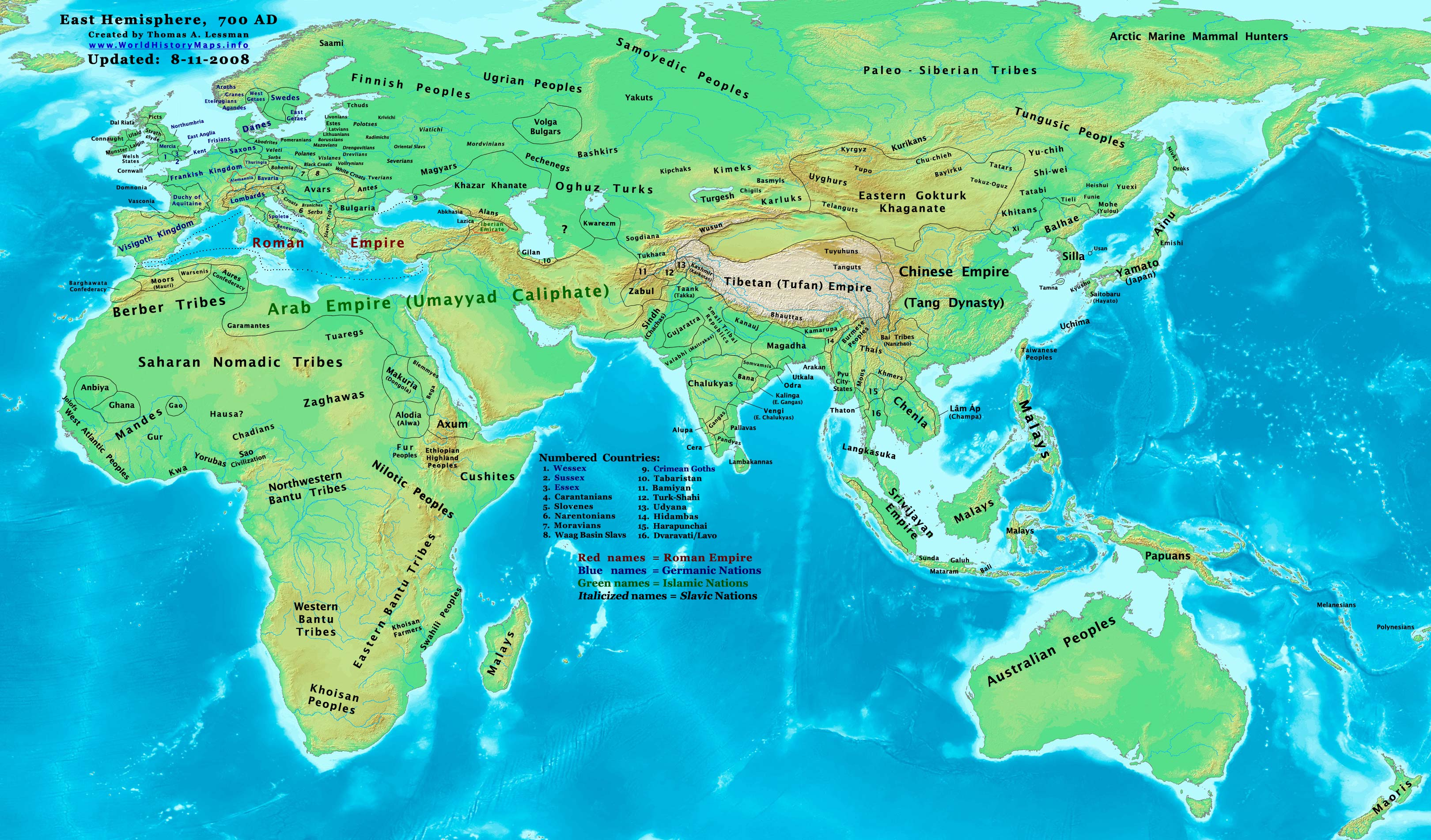
Map of the world during the early Middle Ages 700 AD

=== Horn of Africa ===
| Name | Capital | State type | From | To | Flag |
|---|---|---|---|---|---|
| Adal | Zeila, Dakkar, Harrar | sultanate | 1415 | 1559 | |
| Ajuran Empire | Mareeg, Qelafo, Mecca | empire | 13th cent. | 17th cent. | |
| Aksumite Empire | | empire | 100 | 960 | |
| Sultanate of Arababni | | sultanate | 12th cent. | 1840 | |
| Sultanate of Bale | | sultanate | 13th cent. | 1320s | |
| Dankali Sultanate | Dankali | sultanate | 13th cent. | 18th cent. | |
| Sultanate of Dahlak | Dahlak | sultanate | 960 | 1557 | |
| Kingdom of Damot | Maldarede | kingdom | 960 | 1317 | |
| Dawaro | | principality | 960s | 1601 cent. | |
| Ennarea | Yadare, Gowi | kingdom | 14th cent. | 1710 | |
| Ethiopian Empire | Addis Ababa | empire | 1137 | 1975 | |
| Fatagar | | state | 9th cent. | 15th cent. | |
| Gidaya | | Islamic state | 9th cent. | 15th cent. | |
| Hargaya | | Islamic state | 9th cent. | 15th cent. | |
| Harla Kingdom | Hubat | kingdom | 501 | 1500 | |
| Sultanate of Ifat | Wafat, Ziela | sultanate | 1275 | 1403 | |
| Makhzumi dynasty | Walale | sultanate | 896 | 1286 | |
| Medri Bahri | Debarwa | kingdom | 1137 | 1879 | |
| Sultanate of Mogadishu | Mogadishu | sultanate | 10th cent. | 16th cent. | |
| Moro | | Islamic state | 9th cent. | 15th cent. | |
| Kingdom of Simien | | kingdom | 350 | 1625 | |
| Tunni Sultanate | Baraea | sultanate | 9th cent. | 13th cent. | |
| Zagwe dynasty | Lalibela | kingdom | 960 | 1270 | |

=== Sudan ===
| Name | Capital | State type | From | To | Flag |
|---|---|---|---|---|---|
| Al-Abwab | | kingdom | 13th cent. | 15th/16th cent. | |
| Alodia | Soba | empire | 680 | 1504 | |
| Beja kingdoms | | tribal kingdoms | 7th cent. | 16th cent. | |
| Blemmyes | | tribal kingdom | 600 BC | 8th cent. AD | |
| Daju kingdom | Daju | kingdom | 12th cent. | 15th cent. | |
| Kingdom of Fazughli | | kingdom | 1500 | 1685 | |
| Makuria | Dongola | kingdom | 340 | 1312 | |
| Nobatia | Pachoras | kingdom | 350 | 650 | |
| Shilluk | Fashoda | kingdom | 1490 | 1865 | |
| Tunjur kingdom | Uri | kingdom | 1400s | 1650s | |

=== Sahel/West Africa ===
| Name | Capital | State type | From | To | Flag |
|---|---|---|---|---|---|
| Sultanate of Agadez | Agadez | sultanate | 1404 | 1906 | |
| Kingdom of Ardra | Alladh | kingdom | 12th/13th cent. | 1724 | |
| Benin Empire | Benin City | empire | 1440 | 1897 | |
| Bornu Empire | Ngazargamu | empire | 1380 | 1893 | |
| Denkyira | Dunkwa-on-Offin | kingdom | 1500 | 1701 | |
| Gao | Gao | empire | 9th cent. | 1430 | |
| Ghana Empire | Koumbi Saleh | empire | 400 | 1235 | |
| Great Fulo | Anyam-Godo | empire | 1490 | 1776 | |
| Guinala | Bruco | kingdom | 14th cent. | 19th cent. | |
| Gyaaman | Sampa | state | 1450 | 1895 | |
| Hausa Kingdoms | various | city-state kingdoms | 9th cent. | 1808 | |
| Ife Empire | Ile-Ifẹ | empire | 1200 | 1410 | |
| Isedo | Isedo | kingdom | 1300 | 17th cent. | |
| Jolof | Linguere | empire | 1350 | 1549 | |
| Igodomigodo | Ubinu | kingdom | 40 BC | 1100 AD | |
| Kaabu | Kansala | empire | 1537 | 1867 | |
| Kanem Empire | Njimi | empire | 700 | 1387 | |
| Mali | Niani, Kangaba | empire | 1230 | 1670 | |
| Nri | Igbo-Ukwu | kingdom | 948 | 1911 | |
| Oron Nation | Oron | kingdom | 1200 | 1908 | |
| Oyo Empire | Oyo-Ile | kingdom | 1400 | 1905 | |
| Songhai Empire | Gao | empire | 1464 | 1591 | |
| Sosso Empire | Sosso | empire | 1076 | 1235 | |
| Takedda | Takedda | kingdom | 1200 | 1600 | |
| Takrur | Tumbere Jiinge, Taaga, Hoorewendu | kingdom | 500s | 1456 | |

=== Bantu States ===
| Name | Capital | State type | From | To | Flag |
|---|---|---|---|---|---|
| Angoche | Angoche, Moma | kingdom | 1485 | 1910 | |
| Ankole | Mbarara | kingdom | 1478 | 1967 | |
| Kingdom of Butua | Khami | kingdom | 1450 | 1683 | |
| Kasanze Kingdom | | kingdom | 1500 | 1648 | |
| Kilwa Sultanate | Kilwa | sultanate | 957 | 1513 | |
| Kongo | São Salvador | kingdom/client | 1390 | 1914 | |
| Kongo dia Nlaza | | confederation of kingdoms | 14th cent. | 15th cent. | |
| Mapungubwe | not specified | kingdom | 1075 | 1220 | |
| Mutapa | Zvongombe | kingdom | 1430 | 1760 | |
| Swahili city-states | | city-states | 9th cent. | 18th cent. | |
| Kingdom of Zimbabwe | Great Zimbabwe | kingdom | 1220 | 1450 | |

== Americas ==
These are prehistoric states, listed either based on archaeological evidence or based on their existence at the time of European contact. Nahua tribes/cities.

| Name | Capital | State type | From | To | Flag |
|---|---|---|---|---|---|
| Chiefdom of Ameca | Ameca | chiefdom | 1325 | 1522 | |
| Aymara kingdoms | various | kingdoms | 1151 | 1477 | |
| Azcapotzalco | Azcapotzalco | kingdom | 995 | 1428 | |
| Aztec Empire | Tenochtitlan | empire | 1428 | 1521 | |
| Cañari | Tumebamba | tribal confederacy | 500 | 1533 | |
| Chachapoya | | tribal confederacy | 800 | 1470 | |
| Chalco | various | kingdom | 13th cent. | 1521 | |
| Chimor | Chan Chan | kingdom | 900 | 1470 | |
| Cocollán | Cocollan | chiefdom | 1100 | 1521 | |
| Chincha Kingdom | | kingdom | 900 | 1450 | |
| Colhuacan | Colhuacan | city-state | 717 | 1521 | |
| Kingdom of Cusco | Cusco | kingdom | 1200 | 1438 | |
| Ichma Kingdom | Pachacamac | kingdom | 1100 | 1469 | |
| Inca Empire | Cusco | empire | 1438 | 1533/72 | |
| Haudenosaunee | Onondaga | tribal confederation | 1142 | 1794 | |
| Maya | various | kingdom city states | 2000 BC | 900 AD | |
| Mississippian culture | | various | 800 | 1600 | |
| Moche | Moche-Trujillo | united independent polities | 100 | 800 | |
| Muisca | Bacatá,Hunza, and Suamox, Tundama (800–1540) | Various | c.800 AD | 1540 | |
| Nazca | various | tribal chiefdoms | 100 BC | 800 AD | |
| Powhatan Confederacy | Werowocomoco | tribal confederacy | 16th cent. | 1686 | |
| Pueblo | various | tribal chiefdoms | 12th cent. BC | 14th cent. AD | |
| Purépecha Empire | Tzintzuntzan | empire | 1300 | 1530 | |
| Quilmes | Quilmes | chiefdom | 850 | 1500 | |
| Plum Bayou | | tribal chiefdoms | 650 | 1600 | |
| Teotihuacan Empire | Teotihuacan | empire | 100 BC | 8th cent. AD | |
| Tiwanakun Empire | Tiwanaku | empire | 300 | 1000 | |
| Tlatelolco | Tlatelolco | empire | 1337 | 1473 | |
| Tlaxcala | Tlaxcala | confederacy | 1348 | 1520 | |
| Toltec Empire | Tula | empire | 674 | 1122 | |
| Tiwanakun Empire | Tiwanaku | Empire | 300 | 1000 AD | |
| Tiwanaku polity | Tiwanaku | various | 600 | 1000 | |
| Veracruz | El Tajín | city-states | 1200 | 1438 | |
| Xochimilco | Xochimilco | kingdom | 900 | 1521 | |
| Wari Empire | Huari | empire | 500 | 1100 | |
| Zapotec | Zaachila | kingdom city states | 700 BC | 1521 AD | |
| Muisca Confederation | Hunza and Bacatá | tribal confederacy | ~1450 | 1540 | |
| Tairona | various | tribal chiefdoms | 2nd cent. BC | 16th cent. AD | |

== See also ==
- List of Bronze Age states (c. 3300–1200 BC)
- List of Iron Age states (c. 1200–600 BC)
- List of Classical Age states (c. 600 BC–200 AD)
- List of states during Late Antiquity (c. 200–700)
- List of former sovereign states
- Timeline of the Middle Ages
- List of pre-modern great powers
- List of pre-modern states
- List of States of the Holy Roman Empire
