= Vladimir Voldin =

Khanty poet in the Soviet era

- Born: 1938
- Died: October 1971 (aged 32–33)
- Occupations: poet, translator, journalist
- Spouse: Maria Vagatova
- Writing career
- Language: Khanty

Vladimir Semyonovich Voldin (Russian: Владимир Семёнович Волдин; 1938–1971) was a Khanty poet of the Soviet period.

He was from Khanty-Mansiisk region, the Northern Khanty area.

He wrote in the Northern dialect of Khanty language. He was a lyric poet, writing no prose and not being interested by social or political themes. He also was a correspondent for area radio.

His wife was Maria Vagatova, whom he encouraged to publish her poetry. After marriage with her Voldin suddenly disappeared during a business trip. Later he was found hanged. His wife Maria was left with 4 children. By the time of 2010, Maria had 7 grandchildren.

== Sources ==
- Vaschenko, Alexander; Clayton Smith, Claude; Momaday, N. Scott (2010). The Way of Kinship: An Anthology of Native Siberian Literature. University of Minnesota Press. ISBN 9781452915463.
- Alia, Valerie (2010). The New Media Nation: Indigenous Peoples and Global Communication. Berghahn Books. ISBN 9781845454203.
