= Principality of Obdorsk =

Principality in Siberia

Principality of Obdorsk Обдорское княжество
- 1300s-1886
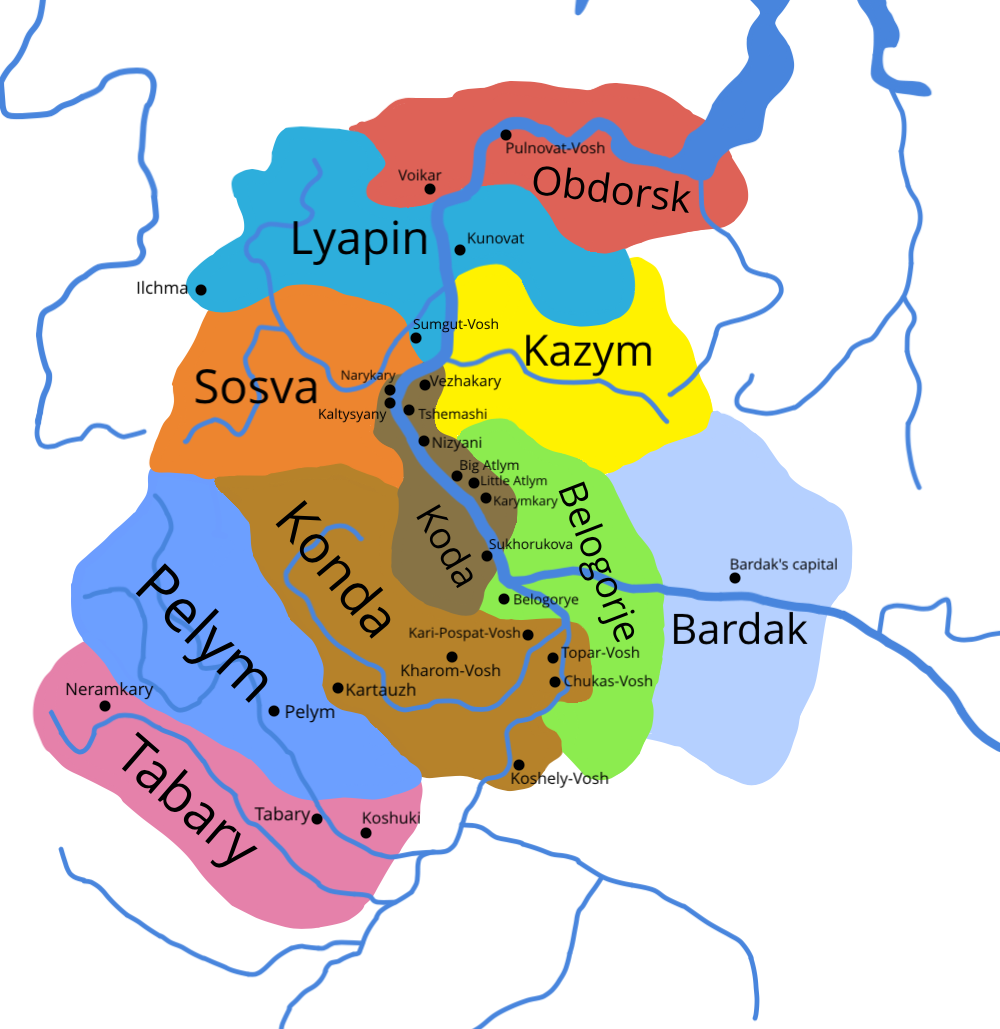
- Map of the Ugrian Khanty principalities. Obdorsk is the northernmost principality.
- Capital: Pulvonat-vosh
- Common languages: Khanty language, Old East Slavic
- Religion: Shamanism, Russian Orthodoxy
- Government: Absolute Monarchy
- History
  - Established: 1300s
  - Death of Prince Ivan Taishin, refusal by Russia to pass down princely titles: 1886
Succeeded by
Russian Empire
- Today part of: Russia

The Principality of Obdorsk (Cyrillic: Обдорское княжество), also known as Obdor or Obdoria, was a Khanty principality located in north Western Siberia existing from the 14th to the 17th century, though its princes retained noble titles until the late 19th century. They were the northernmost of the Yugra Khanty states, and corresponding with their name (lit. in Komi "Ob mouth"), their territory consisting of the mouth of the Ob river, bound to the west by the Urals and to the north the Arctic Ocean. Its territory corresponds approximately to the present day Shuryshkarsky and Priuralsky districts of the Yamal-Nenets Autonomous Okrug. Obdorsk is mentioned in one of the Novgorod birch bark letters (No. 365) dating from the early 40s to the late 80s of the 14th century.

The center of the principality was located at the mouth of the Ob river, extending west into the foothills of the polar Ural Mountains, north into the Yamal peninsula, east into the Nadym River, and south sharing a border with the Principality of Lyapin.

== History ==
=== Early History ===
Little is known about the establishment of Obdorsk, though it can be assumed the region gradually evolved from Khanty kinships into a more complex socio-political organization. This consolidation can be attributed to the Novgorod Republic, whom the Obdor first came into conflict with in 1364 where Novgorodian governors Alexander Abakumovich and Stepan Lyapa launched expeditions into the lower Ob. By the beginning of the 15th century, the Obdorsk established relations with Khanty states to its south, mainly the Principality of Lyapin. These relations evolved into alliances when the Principality of Kod began to aggressively expanding, raiding frontier towns of its neighbors. Obdorsk's bitter relation with the Kodiches would remain until its dissolution.

The principality originally recognized the authority of the Tumen Khanate, helping other Khanty states resist the expansions of the Grand Duchy of Moscow in the 1480s, though they would eventually concede and recognize Moscow's authority in 1500, among the first to do so. The Muscovites attached great importance to this, as evidenced by the inclusion of the title of Prince Obdorsky in the list of titles of the Grand Duke of Moscow Ivan III.

Even though Obdorsk continued to be a vassal of Moscow, the Obdor princes temporarily switched alliances to Khan Kuchum of the Khanate of Sibir in 1563 to protect themselves from continued raids from the Kodiches. However, as soon as Kuchum was defeated resoundingly by Cossack Yermak Timofeyevich, Obdorsk's reliance on the Siberian Tatar state disappeared and they reaffirmed their dependence to Moscow in 1585.

=== Conflicts with Moscow ===
This dependence didn't save them from continued encroachments onto Obdor lands. A temporary flare-up between Obdorsk and Russia led to the former being defeated by a detachment of Kodiche soldiers, leading to the Russians founding the Obdorsk garrison on the capital of Pulvonat-Vosh (which would become the town of Salekhard). In 1600, Prince Vasily of Obdorsk organized an ambush against the Mangazeya expedition of voivode Miron Shakhovsky, which was successfully beaten, and once again the principality became de facto independent again.

Prince Vasily's, and his son Mamruk's relationship with Moscow would become strained. Despite Tsar Boris I recognizing Vasily's authority and Mamruk receiving a royal letter of princely dignity, Mamruk revolted against Russia and was defeated in 1605. Boris's successor Vasili IV also confirmed their status, yet Vasily and other allied Khanty princes conspired against the Russians to siege the town of Beryozov in 1608. The uprising was suppressed, in part thanks to the Kodiche prince Onzhi Yuriev, and Vasily along with prince Shatkov Luguev of Lyapin were executed in Beryozov. Even still, Mamruk retained the title of prince of Obdorsk. Mamruk would try one more time to overthrow the Russians in 1609 and would fail, Obdorsk thus becoming completely dependent on the tsardom.

=== Under the rule of Moscow ===
Obdorsk continued to more resist Russian control. Even though the first Obdorsk prince to adopt Christianity was baptized in Moscow in 1600, many retained to their shamanist Khanty beliefs. Native Samoyeds and Nenets flocked to the lands of Obdorsk and led civil disturbances there, leading the principality to be a stronghold of native faiths. The line was clearly marked for the Russians: while the southern Khanty were peacefully Christianized, the northern Khanty became the pagan lands.

In 1631, Mamruk once again instigated an attack onto the wealthy Russian colony of Mangazeya, only to be defeated by a sizable Russian contingent. Mamruk's sons Molik and Ermak would continue coordinated attacks on Russian merchants, tribute collectors, and Russian fortifications. Even still, the hopes of overthrowing the Russians seemed more dim; the last attempt by Obdorsk and other volosts of former Khanty principalities to revolt was in 1662 to 1663. The conspiracy was found out, and Ermak was hanged in Beryozov.

The Obdorsk quietly continued operating under the Russian hegemony. The next prince to be ratified by the tsar Feodor III was prince Gynda Molikov. Gynda's son Taisha would succeed him which would begin the royal line of the Taishins.

Even by the beginning of the 1700s, Obdorsk and surrounding lands still were not fully Christianized. However, as military subordination and the forced baptism of natives in the Ob region increased dramatically, many (including those in Obdorsk) perceived this as a "second era of Yermak", harkening back to when the Cossack had launched expeditions deep into Siberia. Even so, this displeasure did not accumulate into any physical disturbances. The principality would continue to assimilate into Russian culture, going so far as to fight on Russia's side against rebellious Nenets in the 1730s. The Obdorsk princes would continue to retain royal titles until 1886, when the children of Prince Ivan Matveyevich Taishin were refused to be given princely titles due to "wedlock".

== List of Princes ==
- Vasilii (1601–1607)
- Mammruk Vasil’evich (1606 – after 1631)
- Molik Mammrukov (1630s–1640s)
- Ermak Mammrukov (1650s–1663)
- Gynda Molikov (1663–1670s)
- Tuchabalda (dates uncertain)
- Prince Taishin Vasilii Duarovich — stolnik (1676–1686), died during the Crimean Campaign (1689)
- Prince Taishin Fedor Suleimanovich — stolnik (1680–1686)
- Taisha Gyndin (1710s)
- Matvei Taishin (1767–?)
- Iakov Matveevich Taishin
- Matvei Iakovlevich Taishin
- Ivan Matveevich Taishin (?–1854)
