= Piebald Horde =

Confederation of tribes in Russia

The Piebald Horde (Russian: Пегая Орда) is the Russian term for a confederation of Selkup and Ket tribes in the Ob and Tom river basins which existed in the 16th century, in what is called the Narym region. It was the eastern neighbor and ally of the Khanate of Sibir. As Russian encroachment became a bigger threat, Piebald found itself in conflict with some of the Ugrian Khanty principalities that had allied itself with the Grand Duchy of Moscow, and later the Tsardom of Russia, namely the Principality of Kod.

== History ==
At the end of the 16th century, the Piebald Horde can be subdivided into two general groups, the Upper Narym and Lower Narym Selkups, with princes Vonya and Kichey at their heads, respectively. Both princes had favorable relationships with each other; it is recorded that Kichey had given his granddaughter's hand in marriage to Vonya's son Taibokhta. Vonya had been exceedingly stubborn with the expanding Tsardom of Russia, refusing to pay the yasak tribute, going as far as to invite Khan Kuchum of the Sibir Khanate and entered into an alliance together. It was only after Vonya's son, Urhnk, was captured by the Cossacks that Vonya reluctantly paid yasak to the Russian associates at Surgut, though after a while he threatened to attack Surgut altogether.

With assistance from allied Ugrian principalities, the Piebald Horde was conquered by Russia shortly after the agreement and the establishment of two forts in Narym (1598) and Ket (1602) at the request of Surgut voivode Osip Pleshcheyev. Even with their history of disobedience, the Piebald princes didn't immediately lose their relevance; Vonya, killed by an unknown cause in 1602, would be succeeded by his son Taibokhta, and Kichey by his son Vagai (who would also be Taibokhta's father-in-law). Taibokhta would request to be freed from the yasak and instead be serviced at the Narym fort with a modest food salary. Kichey's descendants also began to work as servicemen to the Russian military; Vagai would continue to rule as a tributary prince in the Lower Varym volost, and his brother (baptised under the new name Grigory Kichey) would serve at the Narym garrison, as well as Grigory's son Alyoshka and Vagai's cousins Ivan and Olosha. Piebald's nobility would slowly fade into obscurity, and the fort of Narym itself would be abandoned, in part due to its hastily constructed nature.

== Society ==
The Piebald Horde consisted of at least eight tribes: the Kaibangul, Paygula, Selgul, Sorgul, Susigula, Tegula, Chumulgul and Shieshgul. The territory of the Piebald were subordinate to the chief, called a omdylkok. The horde was upheld by a small collection of princes, called either margkoks or koks, along with a separate contingent of warriors (lyak) and hunter militias (kutypara).

Around the end of the 16th century, the Piebald Horde had approximately a population from 3000 to 5000, many engaging in hunting, fishing, rudimentary agriculture, horse breeding, and reindeer herding. The people all lived in dugouts and earthen fortresses for protection.
