= Maria Vagatova =

Russian poet (1936–2026)

- Мария Вагатова
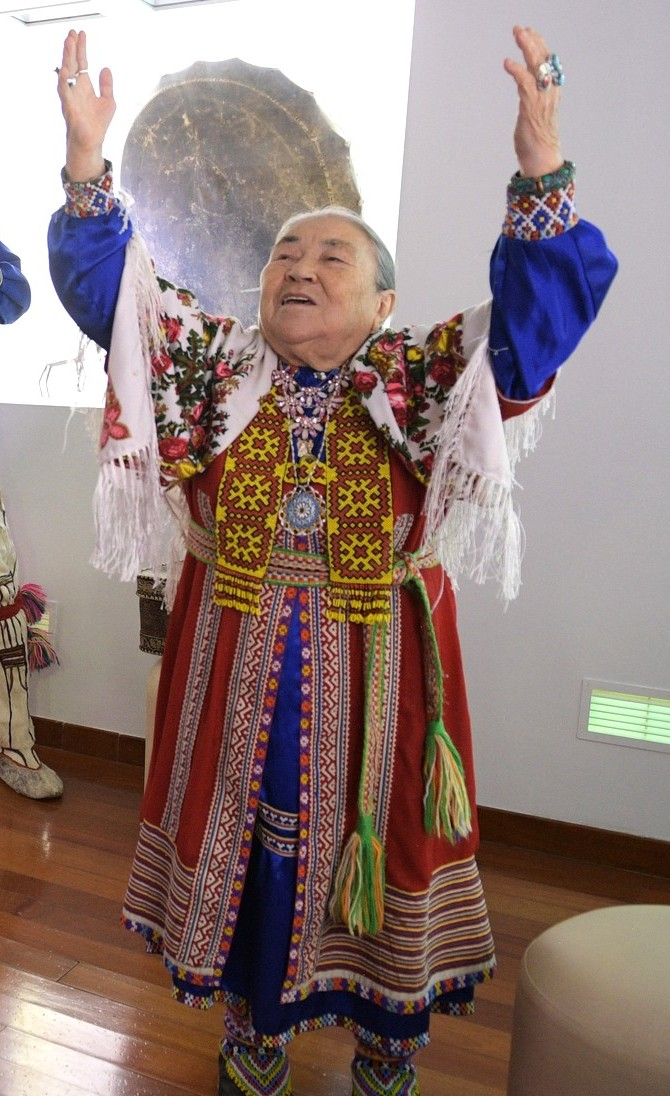
- Vagatova in 2018
- Born: Maria Kuzminichna Voldina; 28 December 1936; Berezovsky District, Ostyak-Vogul National Okrug, Russian SFSR, Soviet Union
- Died: 15 February 2026 (aged 89)
- Education: Leningrad State Pedagogical Institute
- Occupation: poet

Maria Kuzminichna Vagatova (Russian: Мария Кузьминична Вагатова; 28 December 1936 – 15 February 2026), was a first Khanty poetess, also a storyteller, publicist, teacher, editor and journalist.

== Life and career ==
Vagatova was born Maria Kuzminichna Voldina (Note: In this name that follows East Slavic naming customs, the patronymic is Kuzminichna and the family name is Voldina.) (Russian: Мария Кузьминична Волдина) on 28 December 1936 near the village of Yuilsk, Berezovsky District,Ostyak-Vogul National Okrug of the Russian SFSR, then part of the Soviet Union to a family of reindeer herders. She attended the Leningrad State Pedagogical Institute. After graduating she worked as a teacher and in the editorial office of the newspaper Leninskaya Pravda.

Throughout her life, she published a number of poetry collections and fairy tales.

Vagatova died on 15 February 2026, at the age of 90.

== Political views ==
In 2022, she signed a letter in support of the Russian military invasion of Ukraine.

== Awards ==
- 1987 – Honored Worker of Culture of the RSFSR.
- 2018 – Prize of the Government of the Russian Federation "Soul of Russia" for contribution to the development of folk art in the category "Traditional Folk Culture.
