= Khanty =

Indigenous people of Western Siberia

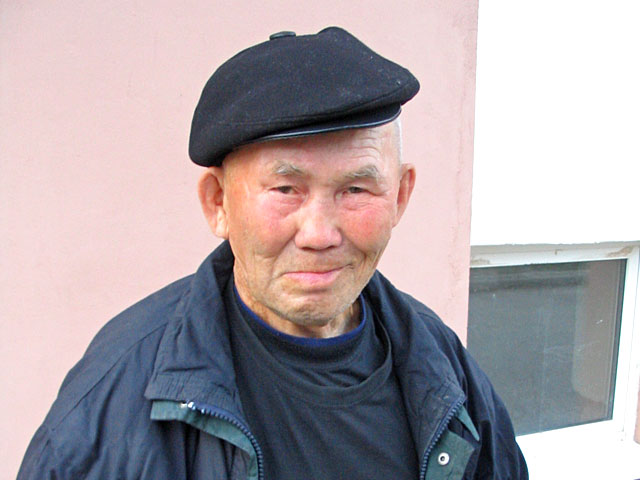
- Khanty man in Tomsk, 2006.

Total population
- 33,000

Regions with significant populations
- Khanty-Mansi Autonomous Okrug (Russia)
- Russia: 31,467 (2021)

Languages
- Khanty, Russian

Religion
- Russian Orthodoxy, Shamanism

Related ethnic groups
- Mansi (Northern Khanty), Zabolotnie Tatars, Selkups (Eastern Khanty)

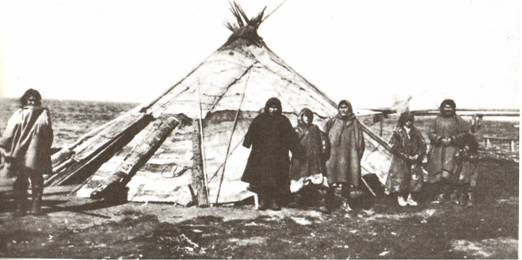
Khanty family standing in front of a chum, their traditional tent

Most Khanty people live in the Khanty–Mansi Autonomous Okrug in western Siberia

The Khanty (Khanty: ха́нты, romanized: khanty), also known in older literature as Ostyaks (Russian: остяки), are an Ob-Ugric indigenous people, living in Khanty–Mansi Autonomous Okrug, a region historically known as "Yugra" in Russia, together with the Mansi. In the autonomous okrug, the Khanty and Mansi languages are given co-official status with Russian. In the 2021 Census, 31,467 persons identified themselves as Khanty. Of those, 30,242 were resident in Tyumen Oblast, of whom 19,568 were living in Khanty-Mansi Autonomous Okrug and 9,985—in Yamalo-Nenets Autonomous Okrug. 495 were residents of neighbouring Tomsk Oblast, and 109 lived in Sverdlovsk Oblast.

== Ethnonym ==
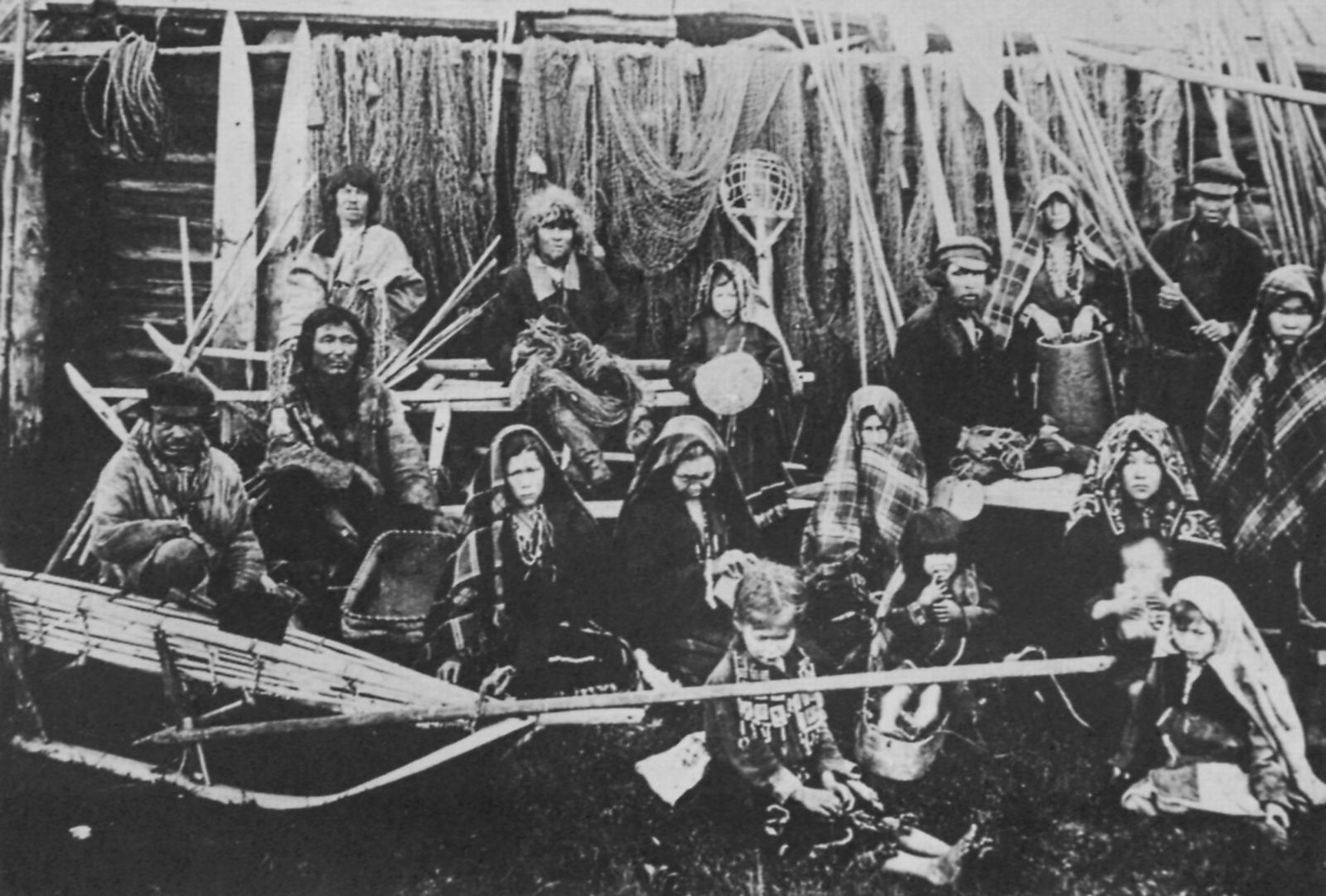
Khanty from the Ob river

Since the Khanty language has about 10 dialects which can be united in 3 main branches, there are several slightly different words used by these people to describe themselves:

- Khanti, Khante (in North)
- Khande (in South)
- Kantek, Kantakh (in East)

All these words mean 'human'. They also call themselves As Khoyat which means 'Obian people' or 'people from Ob'.

== History ==
In the second millennium BC, the territories between the Kama and the Irtysh Rivers were the home of a Proto-Uralic-speaking population that had contacts with Proto-Indo-European speakers from the south. The woodland population is the ancestor of the modern Ugrian inhabitants of Trans-Uralia. Other researchers say that the Khanty people originated in the south Ural steppe and moved northwards into their current location about 500 AD.

Khanty probably appear in Russian records under the name Yugra (ca. 11th century), when they had contact with Novgorodian hunters and merchants. The name of Yugra derives from Komi-Zyrian word jögra ('Khanty'). The older Russian name Ostyak is from Khanty as-kho 'person from the Ob (as) River,' with -yak after other ethnic terms like Permyak.

Some Khanty princedoms were partially included in the Siberia Khanate from the 1440s–1570s.

In the 11th century, Yugra was actually a term for numerous tribes, each having its own centre and its own chief. Every tribe had two exogamic phratries, termed mon't' and por, and all members were considered to be blood relatives. This structure was later replaced with clans, where each clan leader (knyazets) negotiated with the Russian realm. They also participated in Russian campaigns, and received the right to collect yasaq (tribute) from two Khanty volosts (districts) respectively. When this structure was no longer needed, Russia deprived them of their privileges.

After the Russian conquest of Siberia, Russians attempted to Christianize the Khanty. Russian missionaries and officials instructed that idols be destroyed, mass baptisms be performed, and harsh punishment for those that disobeyed the church. Russian officials also took Khanty children as hostages and converted them to Christianity. Conversions were generally superficial in nature and motivated by economic incentives. As a consequence, the Khanty continued to incorporate Native practices and beliefs into their spirituality.

During the Soviet period the Khanty were one of the few Indigenous minorities of Siberia to be granted an autonomy in the form of an okrug (autonomous district). The establishment of autonomy has played a considerable role in consolidation of the ethnos (the Western Khants called their eastern neighbours Kantõk [the Other People]). However, in the 1930s concerted efforts were made by the Soviet state to collectivise them. The initial stages of this meant the execution of tribal chiefs, who were labelled "kulaks", followed by the execution of shamans. The abduction by the state of the children who were sent to Russian-speaking boarding schools provoked a national revolt in 1933 called the Kazym rebellion.

After the end of the Stalin period this process was relaxed and efforts were intensified in the 1980s and 1990s to protect their common territory from industrial expansion of various ministries and agencies. The autonomy has also played a major role in preserving the traditional culture and language.

== Organisation ==
The Khanty are one of the Indigenous minorities in Siberia with an autonomy in the form of an okrug (autonomous area), forming Khanty-Mansi Autonomous Okrug along with Mansi people.

== Culture ==
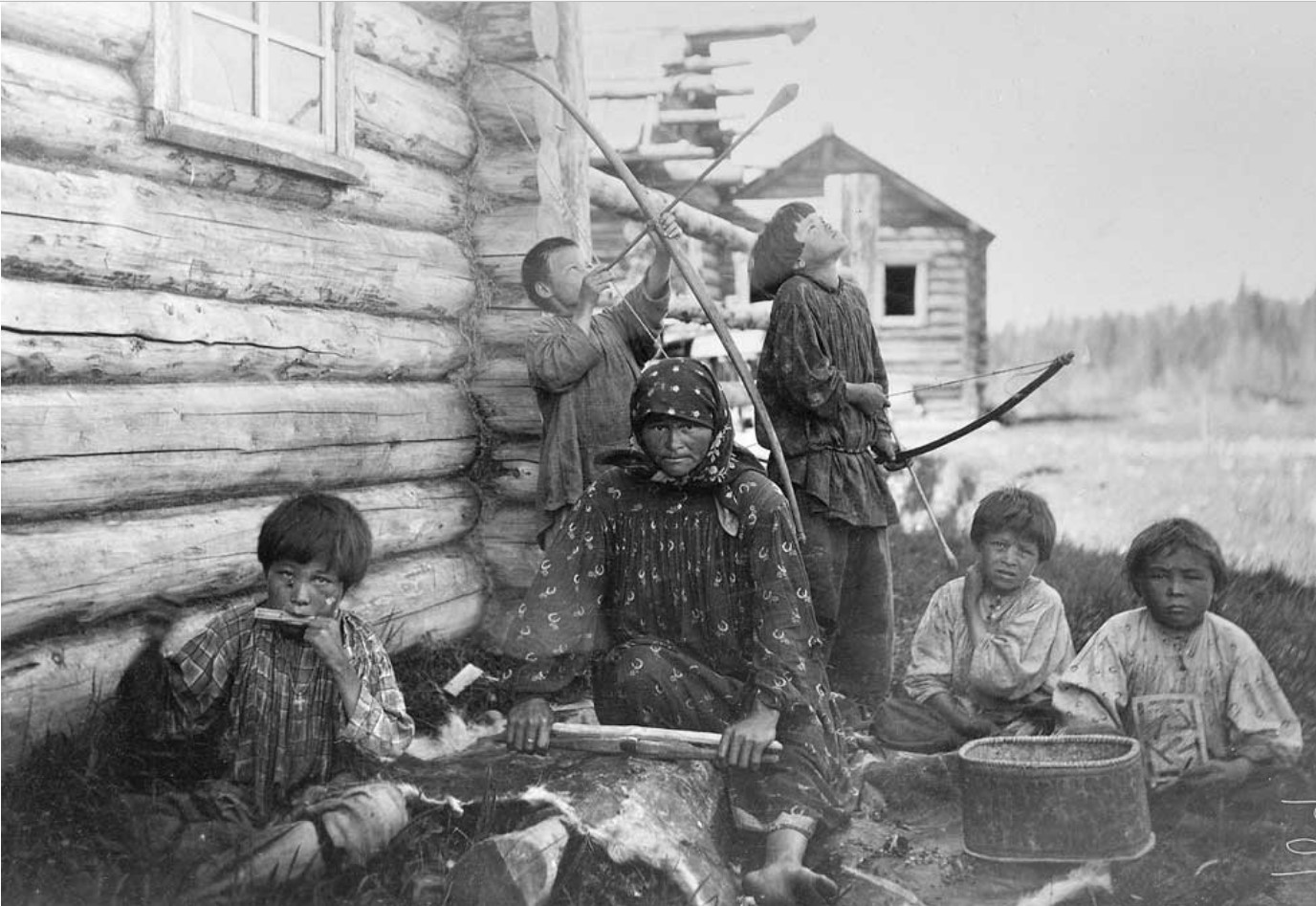
Khanty family

The Khanty share many cultural similarities with the Mansi people. Together they are called Ob-Ugric peoples.

=== Economy and livelihood ===
The Khantys' traditional occupations were fishery, taiga hunting and reindeer herding. They lived as trappers, thus gathering was of major importance.

During the winter, the Khanty lived in stationary huts made out of dirt and branches at permanent villages. During the spring, the Khanty moved towards hunting and fishing grounds, where they constructed temporary rectangular-shaped shelters out of birch-bark and poles.

Weapons utilized by the Khanty were advanced for the period and included longbows, arrows, spears, and the use of iron helmets and chain mail.

=== Religion ===
Most Khanty are today Orthodox Christians, mixed with traditional beliefs (shamans, reincarnation). Their historical shaman wore no special clothes except a cap. Traditional Khanty cults are closely related to nature. The Crow spring celebration is being celebrated in April, nowadays it is April 7, the same day as the Annunciation day. The Bear Celebration is being celebrated occasionally after a successful hunting of a bear. The Bear Celebration continues 5 or 6 days (the duration depends on the sex of the animal). Over 300 songs and performances occur during a Bear Celebration. The most important parts of the celebration are:

- Nukh Kiltatty Ar (The Awakening Song)
- Ily Vukhalty Ar (The Coming Down From The Sky Song) - The story about the son of Torum (the sky god). The son was sent by Torum to rule the Earth. He has forgotten father's advice, lost his immortality, turned into a beast and has been killed by the hunters.
- Il Veltatty Ar (The Lullaby)

=== Oral and written literature ===
In addition to bear songs, fairy tales and other stories, Khanty folklore includes epic poetry. It shares similar themes with the mythical and heroic stories told by the Mansi people.

The Khanty's written literature had its beginnings in the first half of the 20th century. The first notable Khanty writer was Grigori Lazarev, best known for his novel Sorneng tow.

=== Media ===
Khanty yasang is a Khanty-language newspaper that was founded in 1957. Another Khanty-language newspaper is Lukh avt, founded in 2001.

== Language ==
The Khanty language is part of the Ugric branch of the Uralic languages, and thus most closely related to Mansi and Hungarian.

The Khanty language and people are studied through Khanty studies.

== Genetics ==
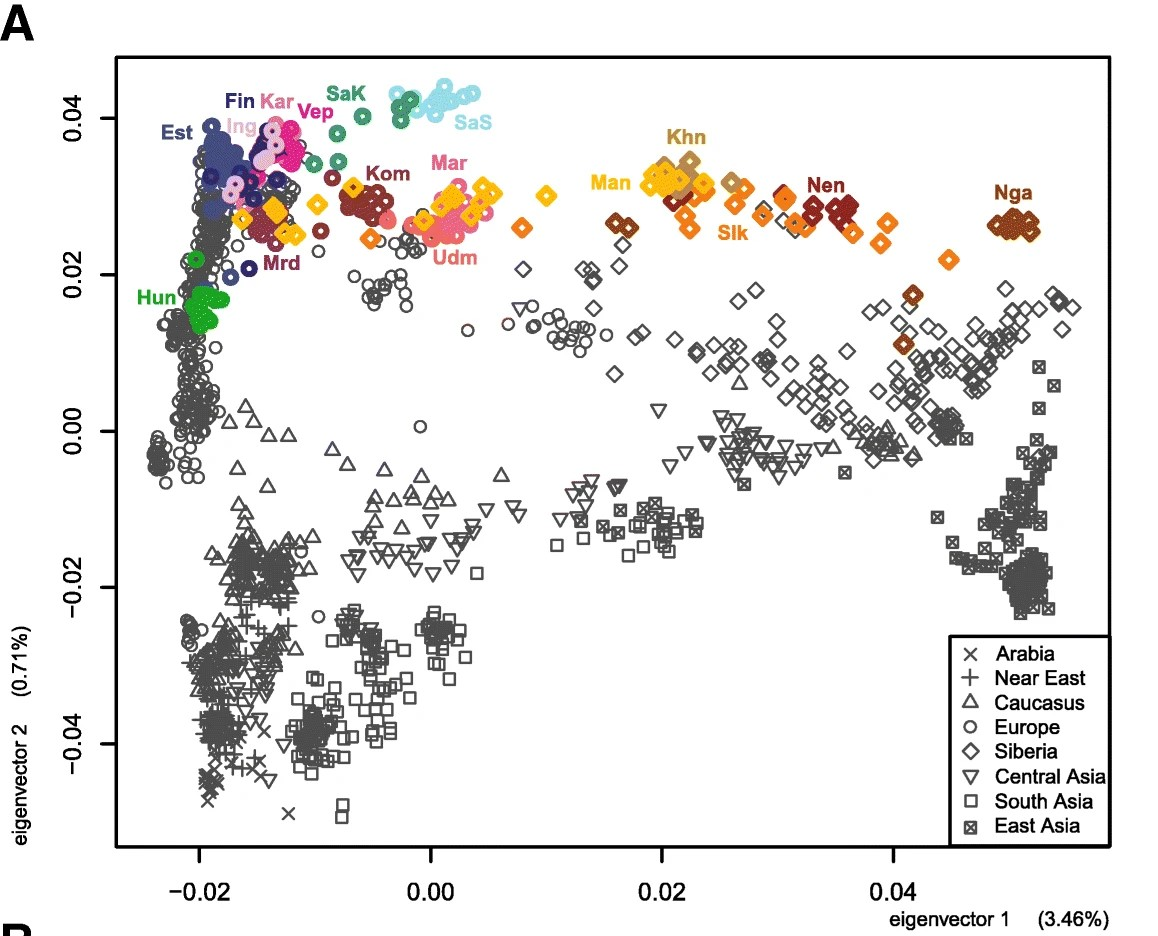
Khanty (Khn) and other Uralic populations in a PCA.

=== Y-DNA ===
80-64.3 percent of Khanty men carry the haplogroup N. In Tambets et al, 2018, 48.8 percent of them belong to its subgroup N1c and 31.4 percent belong to the subclade N-P43. Other haplotypes include R1b (10.5%) and R1a (5.8%).-(25%), related to the R1a found in other south Siberian peoples. Kazym Khanty are elevated in Q1b.

=== mtDNA ===
The most common mtDNA haplogroup among the Khantys is U (28.3%). 16.5 percent of Khanty women belong to its subgroup U4, 5.7 percent to subgroup U7, 5.4 percent to subgroup U5, and the subclades U2 and U1 are found with frequencies of less than one percent. Other maternal haplogroups include H (17.3%), J (13.1%), D (11.6%) and C (10.4%).

=== Autosomal DNA ===
An estimated 61 percent of the Khanty's autosomal DNA is Nganasan-like Siberian and the rest is West Eurasian.

== Notable Khanty ==
- Alachevy, princely family of Khanty origin
- Ambal (fl. 16th and 17th c.), Khanty and Tatar prince
- Yeremey Aypin (born 1948), Khanty writer and politician
- Grigori Lazarev (1917–1979), Khanty journalist and writer
- Roman Rugin (1939–2016), Khanty writer, journalist and professor
- Mikul Shulgin (1940–2007), Khanty poet
- Mitrofan Tebetev (1924–2011), Khanty artist
- Maria Vagatova (1936–2026), first Khanty poetess, also a storyteller, publicist, teacher, editor and journalist
- Vladimir Voldin (1938–1971), Khanty poet

== Gallery ==
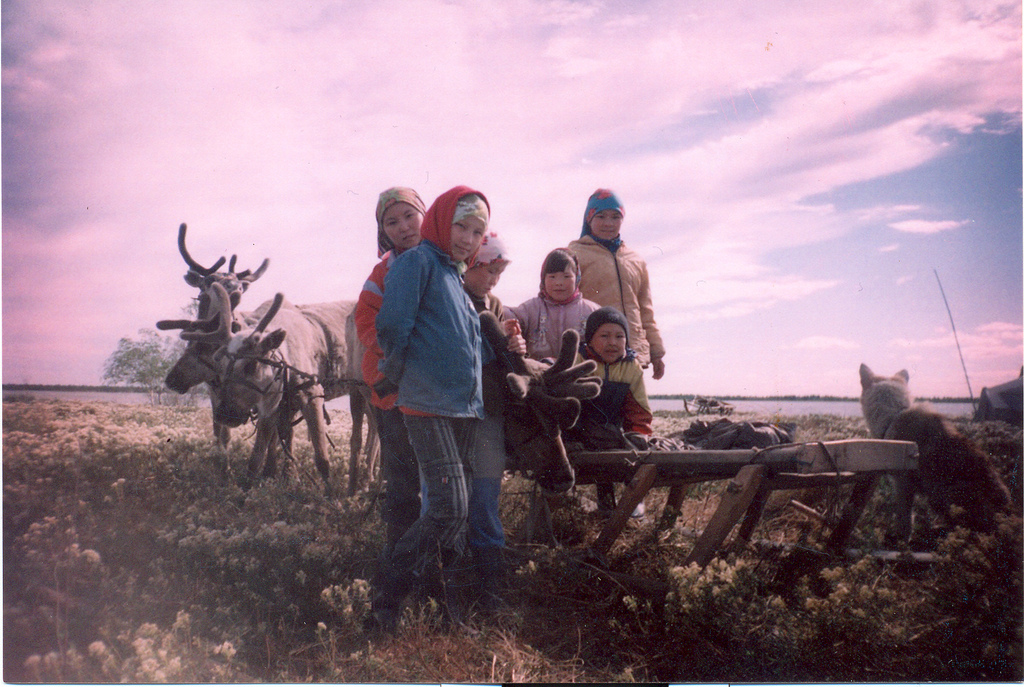
Khanty children pose for the camera in front of a reindeer sledge near Lake Numto

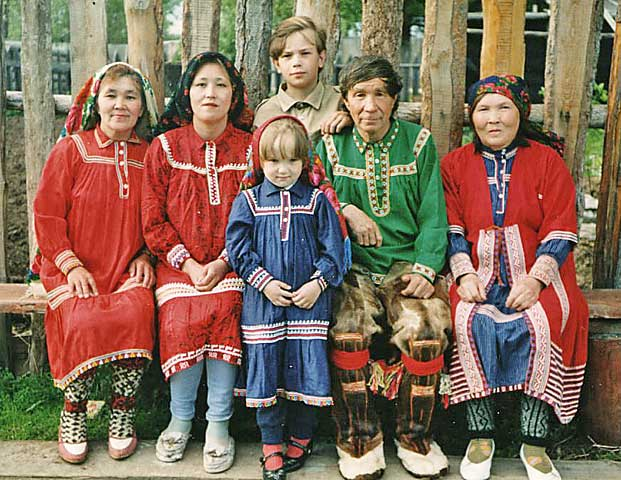
Khanty family at River Ob in the village of Tegi

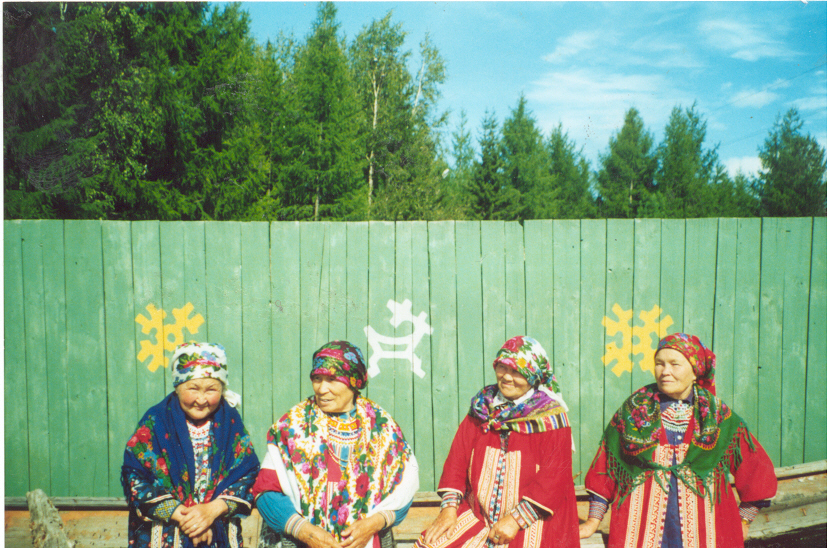
Kazym grandmothers old women in Numsang Yoh nomad camp

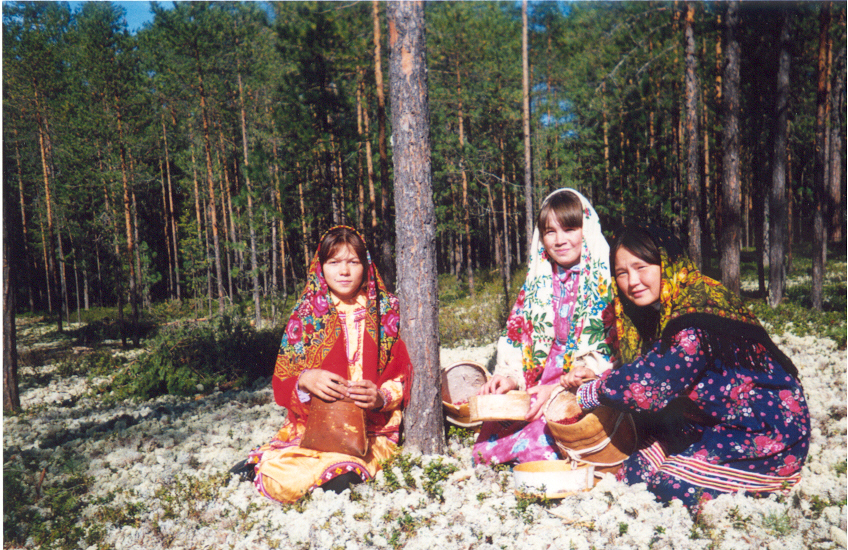
Khanty girls gathering berries

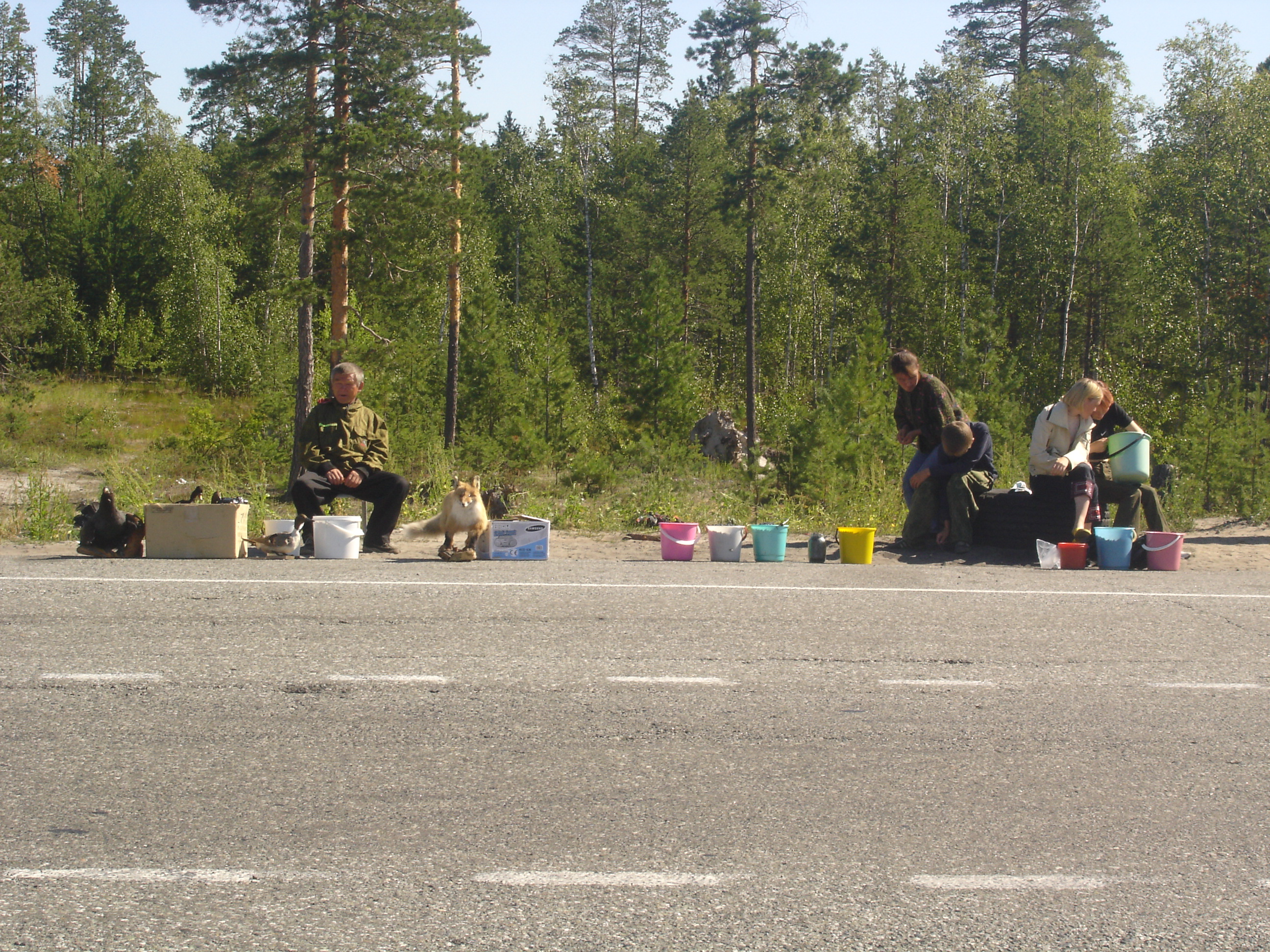
Khanty selling blueberries and stuffed animals

== See also ==
- Principality of Kod, a Khanty principality that existed from the 15th to the 17th centuries
