= Close front rounded vowel =

Vowel sound represented by ⟨y⟩ in IPA

y
- IPA number: 309

Audio sample
- source · help

Encoding
- Entity (decimal): &#121;
- Unicode (hex): U+0079
- X-SAMPA: y
- Braille: ⠽ (braille pattern dots-13456)
Image

IPA: Vowels

	Front	Central	Back
Close	i y	ɨ ʉ	ɯ u
Near-close	ɪ ʏ		ʊ
Close-mid	e ø	ɘ ɵ	ɤ o
Mid	e̞ ø̞	ə	ɤ̞ o̞
Open-mid	ɛ œ	ɜ ɞ	ʌ ɔ
Near-open	æ	ɐ
Open	a ɶ	ä	ɑ ɒ

- IPA help
- audio
- full chart
- template

Legend: unrounded • rounded

The close front rounded vowel, or high front rounded vowel, is a type of vowel sound, used in some spoken languages. The symbol in the International Phonetic Alphabet that represents this sound is ⟨y⟩. It is most commonly represented orthographically as ⟨ü⟩ (in German, Turkish, Estonian and Hungarian) or ⟨y⟩ (in Danish, Norwegian, Swedish, Finnish and Albanian), but can also be represented by ⟨u⟩ (in French and Dutch and the Kernewek Kemmyn standard of Cornish); ⟨iu⟩/⟨yu⟩ (in the romanization of various Asian languages); ⟨уь⟩ (in Cyrillic-based writing systems such as that for Chechen), or ⟨ү⟩ (in Cyrillic alphabets, such as that for Kazakh).

Short /y/ and long /yː/ occurred in pre-Modern Greek. In the Attic and Ionic dialects of Ancient Greek, front [y yː] developed by fronting from back /u uː/ around the 6th to 7th century BC. A little later, the diphthong /yi/ when not before another vowel monophthongized and merged with long /yː/. In Koine Greek, the diphthong /oi/ changed to [yː], likely through the intermediate stages [øi] and [øː]. Through vowel shortening in Koine Greek, long /yː/ merged with short /y/. Later, /y/ unrounded to [i], yielding the pronunciation of Modern Greek. For more information, see the articles on Ancient Greek and Koine Greek phonology.

The close front rounded vowel is the vocalic equivalent of the labialized palatal approximant [ɥ]. [y] alternates with [ɥ] in certain languages, such as French, and in the diphthongs of some languages, ⟨y̑⟩ with the non-syllabic diacritic and ⟨ɥ⟩ are used in different transcription systems to represent the same sound.

In most languages, this rounded vowel is pronounced with compressed lips ('exolabial'). However, in a few cases the lips are protruded ('endolabial').

== Close front compressed vowel ==
The close front compressed vowel is typically transcribed in IPA simply as ⟨y⟩, and that is the convention used in this article. There is no dedicated diacritic for compression in the IPA. However, the compression of the lips can be shown with the letter ⟨β̞⟩ as ⟨i͡β̞⟩ (simultaneous [i] and labial compression) or ⟨iᵝ⟩ ([i] modified with labial compression). The spread-lip diacritic ⟨ ͍⟩ may also be used with a rounded vowel letter ⟨y͍⟩ as an ad hoc symbol, though technically 'spread' means unrounded.

=== Features ===
- Its vowel height is close, also known as high, which means the tongue is positioned close to the roof of the mouth without creating a constriction that would be classified as a consonant.
- Its vowel backness is front, which means the tongue is positioned forward in the mouth without creating a constriction that would be classified as a consonant. Rounded front vowels are often centralized, which means that often they are in fact near-front.
- Its place of articulation is palatal, which means it is articulated with the middle or back part of the tongue raised to the hard palate.
- Its roundedness is compressed, which means that the margins of the lips are tense and drawn together in such a way that the inner surfaces are not exposed.

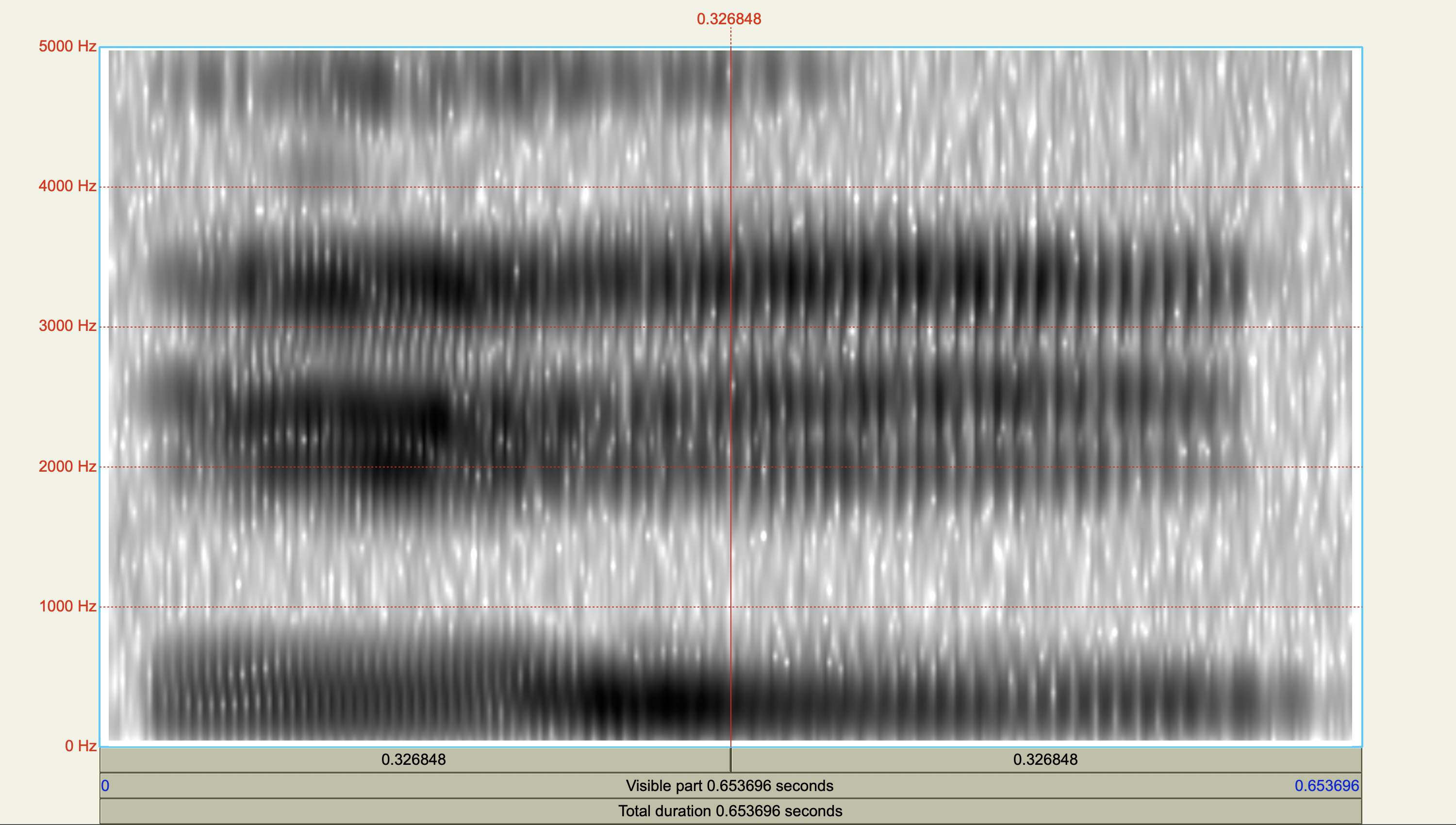
Spectrogram of [y]

=== Occurrence ===
Because front rounded vowels are assumed to have compression, and few descriptions cover the distinction, some of the following may actually have protrusion.

Language		Word	IPA	Meaning	Notes
Afrikaans	Standard	u	[y]	'you' (formal)	Merges with /i/ in younger speakers. See Afrikaans phonology
Albanian	Standard	ylber	[ylbɛɾ]	'rainbow'	
Azerbaijani		güllə	[ɟylˈlæ]	'bullet'	
Bavarian	Amstetten dialect				Contrasts close [y], near-close [ø̝], close-mid [ø] and open-mid [œ] front rounded vowels in addition to the open central unrounded [ä].
Breton		brud	[bʁyːt̪]	'noise'	
Catalan	Northern	but	[ˈbyt]	'aim'	Found in Occitan and French loanwords. See Catalan phonology
Chechen		уьйтӏе / üythe	[yːtʼje]	'yard'	
Chinese	Mandarin	女 / nǚ	[ny˨˩˦]	'woman'	See Standard Chinese phonology and Cantonese phonology
Chinese	Cantonese	書 / syū	[syː˥]	'book'	See Standard Chinese phonology and Cantonese phonology
Chinese	Shanghainese	驢	[ly˧]	'donkey'	See Standard Chinese phonology and Cantonese phonology
Chuvash		тӳме	[tyme]	'button'	
Cornish	Kernewek Kemmyn				
Danish	Standard	synonym	[synoˈnyˀm]	'synonym'	See Danish phonology
Dutch	Standard	nu	[ny]	'now'	Also described as near-close [y˕]. The Standard Northern realization has also been described as close central [ʉ]. See Dutch phonology
English	General South African	few	[fjyː]	'few'	Some younger speakers, especially females. Others pronounce a more central vowel [ʉː]. See South African English phonology
English	Multicultural London	few	[fjyː]	'few'	May be back [uː] instead.
English	Scouse	few	[fjyː]	'few'	May be central [ʉː] instead.
English	Ulster	few	[fjyː]	'few'	Long allophone of /u/; occurs only after /j/. See English phonology
Estonian		üks	[ˈyks]	'one'	See Estonian phonology
Faroese		mytisk	[ˈmyːtɪsk]	'mythological'	Appears only in loanwords. See Faroese phonology
Finnish		yksi	[ˈyksi]	'one'	See Finnish phonology
French		tu	[t̪y]	'you'	The Parisian realization has been also described as near-close [ʏ]. See French phonology
German	Standard	über	[ˈyːbɐ]	'over'	See Standard German phonology
German	Many speakers	schützen	[ˈʃyt͡sn̩]	'protect'	The usual realization of /ʏ/ in Switzerland, Austria and partially also in Western and Southwestern Germany (Palatinate, Swabia). See Standard German phonology
Greek	Tyrnavos	σάλιο / salio	[ˈsäly]	'saliva'	Corresponds to /jo/ in Standard Modern Greek.
Greek	Velventos	σάλιο / salio	[ˈsäly]	'saliva'	Corresponds to /jo/ in Standard Modern Greek.
Hungarian		tű	[t̪yː]	'pin'	See Hungarian phonology
Iaai		ûû	[yː]	'quarrel'	
Kazakh		үй / üi	[yj]	'house'	
Korean		뒤 / dwi	[ty(ː)]	'back'	Now usually a diphthong [ɥi], especially in Seoul and surrounding dialects. See Korean phonology
Kurdish	Kurmanji (Northern)	kü	[kʰyːɥ]	'mountain'	Equal to Palewani (Southern) [ʉː]. See Kurdish phonology
Limburgish		zuut	[zyːt]	'sees'	Central [ʉː] in Maastricht. The example word is from the Weert dialect.
Lombard	Most dialects	ridüü riduu	[riˈdyː]	'laughed'	
Low German		für / fuur	[fyːɐ̯]	'fire'	
Löyöp		vujuwa	[vyʧywa]	'one'	
Luxembourgish		Hüll	[hyl]	'envelope'	Occurs only in loanwords. See Luxembourgish phonology
Mongolian	Inner Mongolia	түймэр / tüimer	[tʰyːmɘɾɘ̆]	'prairie fire'	Diphthong [uj] in Khalkha.
Norwegian		syd	[syːd]	'south'	The example word is from Urban East Norwegian, in which the vowel varies in rounding between compressed [yː] and protruded [y̫ː]. It can be diphthongized to [yə̯]. See Norwegian phonology.
Occitan		musica	[my'ziko]	'music'	See Occitan phonology
Plautdietsch	Canadian Old Colony	buut	[byːt]	'builds'	Corresponds to back [u] in other varieties.
Portuguese	Azorean	figura	[fiˈɣyɾə]	'figure'	Stressed vowel, fronting of original /u/ in some dialects. See Portuguese phonology
Portuguese	Algarve	tudo	[ˈt̪yðu]	'all'	Stressed vowel, fronting of original /u/ in some dialects. See Portuguese phonology
Portuguese	Brazilian	déjà vu	[d̪e̞ʒɐ ˈvy]	'déjà vu'	Found in French and German loanwords. Speakers may instead use [u] or [i]. See Portuguese phonology
Saterland Frisian		wüül	[vyːl]	'wanted' (v.)	
Scottish Gaelic	younger Lewis speakers	cù	[kʰyː]	'dog'	Normal allophone of [uː]. More central as [ʉː] among older speakers. See Scottish Gaelic phonology
Swedish	Central Standard	yta	[yːt̪a]	'surface'	Often realized as a sequence [yβ̞] or [yβ]. The height has been variously described as close [yː] and near-close [ʏː]. Typically transcribed in IPA with ⟨ʉː⟩; it is central [ʉː] in other dialects. See Swedish phonology
Turkish		güneş	[ɟyˈn̪e̞ʃ]	'sun'	See Turkish phonology
Uyghur		ئۈزۈم / үзүм / üzüm	[ʔyzym]	'grape'	See Uyghur phonology
West Frisian		út	[yt]	'out'	See West Frisian phonology

== Close front protruded vowel ==
Close front protruded vowel

y᫇

Audio sample
- source · help

Catford notes that most languages with rounded front and back vowels use distinct types of labialization, protruded back vowels and compressed front vowels. However, a few languages, such as Scandinavian ones, have protruded front vowels. One of these, Swedish, even contrasts the two types of rounding in front vowels (see near-close near-front rounded vowel, with Swedish examples of both types of rounding).

As there are no diacritics in the IPA to distinguish protruded and compressed rounding, an old diacritic for labialization, ⟨ ̫⟩, will be used here as an ad hoc symbol for protruded front vowels. Another possible transcription is ⟨yʷ⟩ or ⟨iʷ⟩ (a close front vowel modified by endolabialization), but this could be misread as a diphthong.

Acoustically, this sound is "between" the more typical compressed close front vowel [y] and the unrounded close front vowel [i].

=== Features ===
- Its vowel height is close, also known as high, which means the tongue is positioned close to the roof of the mouth without creating a constriction that would be classified as a consonant.
- Its vowel backness is front, which means the tongue is positioned forward in the mouth without creating a constriction that would be classified as a consonant. Rounded front vowels are often centralized, which means that often they are in fact near-front.
- Its place of articulation is palatal, which means it is articulated with the middle or back part of the tongue raised to the hard palate.
- Its roundedness is protruded, which means that the corners of the lips are drawn together, and the inner surfaces exposed.

=== Occurrence ===
Language		Word	IPA	Meaning	Notes
Kurdish	Palewani (Southern)	کۊ	[kʰy̫ːɥ]	'mountain'	Allophone of [ʉː] in regional dialects. See Kurdish phonology
Norwegian		syd	[sy̫ːd]	'south'	The example word is from Urban East Norwegian, in which the vowel varies in rounding between protruded [y̫ː] and compressed [yː]. It can be diphthongized to [y̫ə̯]. See Norwegian phonology.
Swedish	Central Standard	yla	[²y̫ːlä]	'howl'	Often realized as a sequence [y̫ɥ̫] or [y̫ɥ̫˔] (hear the word: [²y̫ɥ̫lä]); it may also be fricated [y̫ᶻː] or, in some regions, fricated and centralized ([ʉᶻː]). See Swedish phonology

== See also ==
- Near-close near-front protruded vowel
- Close central protruded vowel
- Index of phonetics articles

== Notes ==
Place →	Labial					Coronal										Dorsal					Laryngeal			
Manner ↓	Bilabial		Labiodental		Linguolabial		Dental		Alveolar		Postalveolar		Retroflex		(Alveolo-)palatal		Velar		Uvular		Pharyngeal/epiglottal		Glottal	
Nasal	m̥	m	ɱ̊	ɱ		n̼	n̪̊	n̪	n̥	n	n̠̊	n̠	ɳ̊	ɳ	ɲ̊	ɲ	ŋ̊	ŋ	ɴ̥	ɴ				
Plosive	p	b	p̪	b̪	t̼	d̼	t̪	d̪	t	d			ʈ	ɖ	c	ɟ	k	ɡ	q	ɢ	ʡ		ʔ	
Sibilant affricate							t̪s̪	d̪z̪	ts	dz	t̠ʃ	d̠ʒ	tʂ	dʐ	tɕ	dʑ								
Non-sibilant affricate	pɸ	bβ	p̪f	b̪v			t̪θ	d̪ð	tɹ̝̊	dɹ̝	t̠ɹ̠̊˔	d̠ɹ̠˔			cç	ɟʝ	kx	ɡɣ	qχ	ɢʁ	ʡʜ	ʡʢ	ʔh	
Sibilant fricative							s̪	z̪	s	z	ʃ	ʒ	ʂ	ʐ	ɕ	ʑ								
Non-sibilant fricative	ɸ	β	f	v	θ̼	ð̼	θ	ð	θ̠	ð̠	ɹ̠̊˔	ɹ̠˔	ɻ̊˔	ɻ˔	ç	ʝ	x	ɣ	χ	ʁ	ħ	ʕ	h	ɦ
Approximant		β̞		ʋ				ð̞		ɹ		ɹ̠		ɻ		j		ɰ						˷
Tap/flap		ⱱ̟		ⱱ					ɾ̥	ɾ			ɽ̊	ɽ						ɢ̆		ʡ̆		
Trill	ʙ̥	ʙ							r̥	r		r̠	ɽ̊r̥	ɽr					ʀ̥	ʀ	ʜ	ʢ		
Lateral affricate									tɬ	dɮ			tꞎ	d𝼅	c𝼆	ɟʎ̝	k𝼄	ɡʟ̝						
Lateral fricative							ɬ̪		ɬ	ɮ			ꞎ	𝼅	𝼆	ʎ̝	𝼄	ʟ̝						
Lateral approximant								l̪	l̥	l		l̠	ɭ̊	ɭ	ʎ̥	ʎ	ʟ̥	ʟ		ʟ̠				
Lateral tap/flap									ɺ̥	ɺ			𝼈̊	𝼈		ʎ̆		ʟ̆						

		BL	LD	D	A	PA	RF	P	V	U
Implosive	Voiced	ɓ			ɗ		ᶑ	ʄ	ɠ	ʛ
Implosive	Voiceless	ɓ̥			ɗ̥		ᶑ̊	ʄ̊	ɠ̊	ʛ̥
Ejective	Stop	pʼ			tʼ		ʈʼ	cʼ	kʼ	qʼ
Ejective	Affricate		p̪fʼ	tθʼ	tsʼ	tʃʼ	tʂʼ	tɕʼ	kxʼ	qχʼ
Ejective	Fricative	ɸʼ	fʼ	θʼ	sʼ	ʃʼ	ʂʼ	ɕʼ	xʼ	χʼ
Ejective	Lateral affricate				tɬʼ			c𝼆ʼ	k𝼄ʼ	q𝼄ʼ
Ejective	Lateral fricative				ɬʼ					
Click (top: velar; bottom: uvular)	Tenuis	kʘ qʘ		kǀ qǀ	kǃ qǃ		k𝼊 q𝼊	kǂ qǂ		
Click (top: velar; bottom: uvular)	Voiced	ɡʘ ɢʘ		ɡǀ ɢǀ	ɡǃ ɢǃ		ɡ𝼊 ɢ𝼊	ɡǂ ɢǂ		
Click (top: velar; bottom: uvular)	Nasal	ŋʘ ɴʘ		ŋǀ ɴǀ	ŋǃ ɴǃ		ŋ𝼊 ɴ𝼊	ŋǂ ɴǂ	ʞ	
Click (top: velar; bottom: uvular)	Tenuis lateral				kǁ qǁ					
Click (top: velar; bottom: uvular)	Voiced lateral				ɡǁ ɢǁ					
Click (top: velar; bottom: uvular)	Nasal lateral				ŋǁ ɴǁ					
