= Northern Khanty =

Uralic language spoken in Yamalia, Russia

- хӑнты йасәӈ hănty jasəṇ (Note: Wiktionary Khanty transliteration)
- Pronunciation: [xanti jaːsəŋ]
- Native to: Russia
- Region: Khanty-Mansi Autonomous Okrug, Yamalo-Nenets Autonomous Okrug
- Ethnicity: 15,000 Northern Khanty
- Native speakers: 5,000 - 10,000 (2019)
- Language family: Uralic: Khanty; Northern Khanty
- Dialects: Middle Ob; Kazym; Obdorsk; Shuryshkar
- Writing system: Cyrillic

Official status
- Recognised minority language in: Khanty-Mansi Autonomous Okrug (all Khanty varieties)

Language codes
- ISO 639-3: –
- Glottolog: nort3264 Northern Khanty
- ELP: Northern Khanty
- Map of regions where those who speak the Northern Khanty language.(2020/21); 75%-100% 35%-75% 15%-35%

- Northern Khanty is classified as Severely Endangered by the UNESCO Atlas of the World's Languages in Danger (2010)

Northern Khanty is a Uralic language, frequently considered a dialect of a unified Khanty language, spoken by between 5,000 and 10,000 people. It is the most widely spoken out of all the Khanty languages, the majority composed of 5,000 speakers in the Yamalo-Nenets Autonomous Okrug, in Russia. The reason for this discrepancy is that dialects of Northern Khanty have been better preserved in its northern reaches, and the Middle Ob and Kazym dialects are losing favor to Russian. All four dialects have been literary, beginning with the Middle Ob dialects, but shifting to Kazym, and back to Middle Ob, now the most used dialect in writing. The Shuryshkar dialects are also written, primarily due to an administrative division between the two, as the latter is spoken in the Yamalo-Nenets Autonomous Okrug.

== Dialects ==
Dialects of Northern Khanty:

- Obdorsk (Priuralsky District)
- Berjozov (Synja, Muzhi, Shuryshkar), Kazym, Sherkal

=== Transitional ===
- Atlym, Nizyam

== Phonology ==
=== Kazym ===
==== Consonants ====
The Kazym dialect distinguishes 18 consonants.

Kazym Khanty consonants
		Bilabial	Dental		Retroflex	Palatal	Velar
		Bilabial	plain	pal.	Retroflex	Palatal	Velar
Nasal		m	n	nʲ	ɳ		ŋ
Plosive		p	t				k
Fricative	median		s	sʲ	ʂ		x
Fricative	lateral		ɬ	ɬʲ			
Approximant	median	w				j	
Approximant	lateral		l				
Trill			r				

==== Vowels ====
The vowel inventory is much simpler. Ten vowels are distinguished in initial syllables: six full /i e a ɒ o u/ and four reduced /ĭ ă ŏ ŭ/. In unstressed syllables, four values are found: /ɑ ə ĕ ĭ/.

A similarly simple vowel inventory is found in the Nizyam, Sherkal, and Berjozov dialects, which have full /e a ɒ u/ and reduced /ĭ ɑ̆ ŏ ŭ/. Aside from the full vs. reduced contrast rather than one of length, this is identical to that of the adjacent Sosva dialect of Mansi.

=== Shuryshkar ===
Shuryshkar consonants
	Bilabial	Dental/ Alveolar	Palatal/ized	Retroflex	Velar	Uvular
Nasal	m	n	nʲ		ŋ	
Plosive	p	t			k ~ q	
Affricate			tɕ	tʂ		
Fricative		s	ɕ	ʂ		χ
Lateral		l l̥	lʲ	ɭ		
Approximant	w		j			
Trill		r r̥				

=== Obdorsk ===
==== Vowels ====
The Obdorsk dialect has retained full close vowels and has a nine-vowel system: full vowels /i e æ ɑ o u/ and reduced vowels /æ̆ ɑ̆ ŏ/.

==== Consonants ====
However, it has a simpler consonant inventory, having the lateral approximants /l lʲ/ in place of the fricatives /ɬ ɬʲ/ and having fronted *š *ṇ to /s n/.

== Alphabet ==
A new alphabet scheme for Northern Khanty was published in 2013. The various written standards, such as Kazym (Northern Khanty) and Surgut (Eastern Khanty), have their own versions of this alphabet, with some different letters. The influential Просвещение (Enlightenment/Education) publishing house, which publishes many of the textbooks and early literacy material for the smaller languages of Russia, designed curved-tail variants of the letters ԯ and ң with a tick, namely ԓ and ӈ, and these have been redundantly encoded in Unicode as separate characters. These hooked forms have been chosen as the preferred allographs of these letters for the Kazym alphabet. However, the respected Khanty-language journal Хӑнты ясӑӊ uses the diagonal-tail forms ӆ and ӊ for Kazym.

Kazym alphabet (ԓ ӈ typeface)
А а	Ӑ ӑ	В в	И и	Й й	К к	Л л	Ԓ ԓ (Note: These letters are digitized as ԯ ң, ԓ ӈ, or ӆ ӊ, depending on the publisher.)
Љ љ	М м	Н н	Ӈ ӈ	Њ њ	О о	Ө ө	П п
Р р	С с	Т т	Ᲊ ᲊ	У у	Ў ў	Х х	Ш ш
Щ щ	Ы ы	Є є	Э э	Ә ә

Khanty–IPA correspondence chart
Cyrillic	а	ӑ	в	и	й	к	л	ԯ	љ	м	н	њ	ң	о	ө	п	р	с	т	ᲊ	у	ў	х	ш	щ	ы	є	э	ә
IPA	ɑ	ɐ	β	i	j	k	l	ɬ	ɬʲ	m	n	nʲ	ŋ	ɔ	ɵ	p	r	s	t	tʲ	u	ʉ	x	ʃ	sʲ	ɨ	ɛ	e	ə

[i] и and [ɨ] ы are allophones, breaking the phonemic principle of the alphabet.

== Vocabulary ==
=== Numerals ===
No.	Kazym Khanty numerals	Middle Ob Khanty numerals
1	ит	ит
2	кӑтән	кӑт
3	хөԓәм	хутум
4	њӑԓ	нят
5	вэт	вет
6	хөт	хут
7	ԓапәт	тапыт
8	њивәԓ	нигыт
9	йӑртйӑӈ, йартйаӈ	яръяӈ
10	йӑӈ	яӈ
11	ихущйаӈ	ихо̆съяӈ
12	кӑтхущйаӈ	кӑтхо̆съяӈ
20	хөс	хус
25	хөс вэт	хус вет
30	хөԓәм йаӈ	хутымъяӈ
80	њивәԓ йаӈ	нигытсот
90	йӑртсот	ярсот
100	сот	сот
200	кӑт сот	кӑт сот
1000	щурәс	сёрӑс
2026	-	кӑт сёрӑс хус хут

== Sample texts ==
=== Universal Declaration of Human Rights ===
Article 1 of the Universal Declaration of Human Rights in Kazym Khanty:

Хуԯыева мирӑт вәԯьня па имуртӑн вәԯты щира сєма питԯӑт. Ԯыв нумсаңӑт па ԯывеԯа еԯєм атум ут вєрты па кўтэԯн ԯыв ԯәхсӑңа вәԯԯӑт.
(Хуԓыйэва мирӑт вәԓьња па имуртӑн вәԓты щира сєма питԓӑт. Ԓыв нумсаӈӑт па ԓывэԓа йэԓєм атум ут вєрты па кўтэԓн ԓыв ԓәхсӑӈа вәԓԓӑт.)

Hułyjewa mirăt wəł’nja pa imurtăn wəłty sjira sêma pitłăt. Ływ numsaṇăt pa ływjeła jełêm atum ut wêrty pa kŭtełn ływ łəhsăṇa wəłłăt.

Article 1 of the Universal Declaration of Human Rights in English:

All human beings are born free and equal in dignity and rights. They are endowed with reason and conscience and should act towards one another in a spirit of brotherhood.

=== Declaration on the Rights of Indigenous Peoples ===
Article 1 of the Declaration on the Rights of Indigenous Peoples in Kazym Khanty:

Шуши мирӑт ияха муй па атэԯта вәԯты щир тӑйԯӑт, хуԯыева хӑннєхәйт па мєт вуԯаң вәԯьня вєрӑт, щитӑт мўвтєԯ мирӑт вєрӑт вантты па тўңматты тӑхи мўвтєԯ мирӑт вәԯты щир декларация нєпекн хӑншман па артаԯуман вәԯԯӑт.
(Шуши мирӑт ийаха муй па атэԓта вәԓты щир тӑйԓӑт, хуԓыйэва хӑннєхәйт па мєт вуԓаң вәԓьня вєрӑт, щитӑт мўвтєԓ мирӑт вєрӑт вантты па тўңматты тӑхи мўвтєԓ мирӑт вәԓты щир декларация нєпэкн хӑншман па артаԓуман вәԓԓӑт.)

Šuši mirăt ijaha muj pa atełta wəłty sjir tăjłăt, hułyjewa hănnêhəjt pa mêt wułaṇ wəł’nja wêrăt, sjităt mŭwtêł mirăt wêrăt wantty pa tŭṇmatty tăhi mŭwtêł mirăt wəłty sjir djeklaracija nêpjekn hănšman pa artałuman wəłłăt.

Article 1 of the Declaration on the Rights of Indigenous Peoples in English:

Indigenous peoples have the right to the full enjoyment, as a collective or as individuals, of all human rights and fundamental freedoms as recognized in the Charter of the United Nations, the Universal Declaration of Human Rights and international human rights law.
