= Kintyre Gaelic =

Kintyre Gaelic is an endangered dialect of Scottish Gaelic spoken around Kintyre until the 1900s. It is related to other South Argyll dialects such as Islay and Arran Gaelic.

As of 2001, there were 489 Gaelic speakers in Dal Riada and Kintyre.
