= South Argyll dialect group =

Group of dialects of Scottish Gaelic

The South Argyll dialect group, also referred to as the Southwestern dialect group, is a group of dialects of Scottish Gaelic. The South Argyll dialects are, or were, spoken in the Argyll islands of Colonsay, Islay, Jura and Gigha; the Isle of Arran in Buteshire; and the mainland Argyll districts of Kintyre and southern Knapdale. Islay and Jura dialects, and to a lesser extent Colonsay dialect, are particularly closely related. The dialect group is notable for is relative similarity to Ulster Irish, with Irish dialect of Rathlin Island being closely related particularly to the Arran dialect, some having even classified it as a dialect of Scottish Gaelic.

The majority of South Argyll dialects died out of use in the late 20th or early 21st century, though there remains a native-speaking community in Islay and a few speakers in Colonsay and Gigha, and speakers of non-local Gaelic remain in most of these places.

== Phonological characteristics ==
- The glottal stop /ʔ/ and glottalisation /ˀ/ feature heavily in these dialects primarily to indicate hiatus. Its presence or absence often distinguishes minimal pairs with the same function as tonal differences in the Lewis and Wester Ross dialects, e.g. anam 'soul' [ˈɛˀnəm] vs. ainm 'name' [ˈɛɲəm]. It resembles the stød phenomenon in Danish, and is found to a lesser extent in further-north Argyll dialects.
- The future tense verbal ending -(a)idh is realised as /iç/, compared to the usual /i/.
- The vowels a and à are often raised from their usual /a/ to /ɛ/, e.g. mac 'son' [mɛxk].
- Second vowels in a svarabhakti sequence are unstressed in SA dialects, compared to most other dialects where they are stressed equally to the initial vowel.
- Only two r-phonemes are found in South Argyll: /rˠ/ (or R in Celticist notation), described by Jones as "an apico-alveolar fricative, tap or slight trill", and /ɾ/ (or r in Celticist), "a fricative or tap further forward on the alveolus with the tongue held more or less flat". The palatal /ɾʲ/ is merged with /ɾ/.
- The diphthongization of Old Irish é mostly does not occur, having "less than one eighth of words of this type" realised as /ia/. Lack of diphthongization occurs also to a lesser extent across Argyll and Perthshire. In SA it is most commonly realised either as [ɛː], e.g. sè 'six' [ʃɛˑ], or, particularly in Islay, as [eː].
- Like in Perthshire and almost all other Argyll dialects, the sequence sr is realised as /s̪rˠ/ with no intrusive [t̪].
- The sequence -amh- is realised as /ˈɛvə/ as opposed to northern dialects' /ãũ/, e.g. samhradh 'summer' [ˈs̪ɛvɪ̈ɾɪ̈ɣ].
- Palatalisation of n is more consistently applied than in most northern dialects besides Barra.
- Vowels preceding nn and ll are not diphthongized, as is the case in Irish; historically the consonant was instead geminate, though this no longer applies in many SA dialects, e.g. ceann 'head' [kʲʰɛn̪ˠ(ː)]. Colonsay and the north of Jura exhibit an intermediate phenomenon where diphthongization is slight.

== Morphological characteristics ==
- The genitive case is not consistently applied as it is in the literary language or in Southern Hebridean dialects, a general rule being that the singular genitive form is simply the lenited nominative form, e.g. an cù 'the dog' vs. urball a’ chù 'the dog's tail', which is earball a’ choin in the literary language.
- Verb stems take a broad ending as they do in Irish, e.g. ceannaich 'buy', ceannachaidh mi 'I will buy', compared to the usual Scottish Gaelic realisation of ceannaichidh mi.
- SA dialects use the preposition aig to express pluperfect tense with transitive verbs, e.g. bha na soithichean brist’ aige 'he had broken the dishes' (literally, 'he had the dishes broken'), more often than the preposition air, e.g. bha e air na soithichean a bhriseadh (literally, 'he was after the dishes their breaking') as might be heard in Hebridean Gaelic.
- The verb mand /mɛn̪ˠt̪/ is used to express "can; be able to", as opposed to the more common ’s urrainn do, e.g. cha mhand mi tighinn 'I can't come'. This is primarily found in Islay Gaelic, though it is heard to a lesser extent in other SA dialects.
