= URW =

URW may refer to:

- Unibail-Rodamco-Westfield
- Union of Russian Workers
- United Rubber, Cork, Linoleum and Plastic Workers of America or United Rubber Workers of America, North American trade union
- UnReal World, survival video game
- Unrestricted Warfare, military strategy
- Urawa Station, JR East station code
- URW Type Foundry, also known as URW++
- Sop language, spoken in Papua New Guinea
