= Tje =

Cyrillic letter used for /tʲ/ in two Eastern Khanty dialects

- Ᲊ ᲊ

Usage
- Writing system: Cyrillic
- Type: Alphabetic
- Language of origin: Northern Khanty language, Eastern Khanty language
- Sound values: /tʲ/

History
- Time period: 2013–present

Tje (Ᲊ ᲊ; italics: Ᲊ ᲊ) is a letter of the Cyrillic script. It comes from a ligature of Te (Т т) and soft sign (Ь ь). The letter has been used in Eastern Khanty and Northern Khanty since 2013, where it represents the palatalized voiceless alveolar plosive /tʲ/, like the pronunciation of the t in "tube" in British English.

== Computing codes ==
Tje was added to Unicode in version 16.0:

Character information
Preview	Ᲊ		ᲊ	
Unicode name	CYRILLIC CAPITAL LETTER TJE		CYRILLIC SMALL LETTER TJE	
Encodings	decimal	hex	dec	hex
Unicode	7305	U+1C89	7306	U+1C8A
UTF-8	225 178 137	E1 B2 89	225 178 138	E1 B2 8A
Numeric character reference	&#7305;	&#x1C89;	&#7306;	&#x1C8A;

== Related letters and other similar characters ==
- Љ љ - Cyrillic letter Lje
- Њ њ - Cyrillic letter Nje
- Ԏ ԏ - Cyrillic letter Komi Tje
- Ћ ћ - Cyrillic letter Tshe
