= Eastern Khanty =

Uralic language

- қӑнтәк йасәӈ, ӄӑнтәк йасәӈ ḳăntək jasəṇ (Surgut) (Note: Wiktionary Khanty transliteration); Ӄӑнтәӽ ӄӑнтәк кӧԓ, қӑнтәк кӧԯ
- Pronunciation: [qɑntəɣ kɵɬ] (Note: Vakh Khanty pronunciation)
- Native to: Russia
- Region: Khanty-Mansi Autonomous Okrug, Yamalo-Nenets Autonomous Okrug
- Ethnicity: <1,000 Eastern Khanty
- Native speakers: Vakh-Vasyugan: 100-500; Surgut: 500-1,000 (2019–2025)
- Language family: Uralic: Finno-Ugric?; Ugric?; Khanty; Eastern Khanty
- Dialects: Salym; Surgut; Vakh; Vasyugan
- Writing system: Cyrillic

Official status
- Recognised minority language in: Khanty-Mansi Autonomous Okrug (all Khanty varieties)

Language codes
- ISO 639-3: –
- Glottolog: east2774 Eastern Khanty
- ELP: Eastern Khanty
- Map of regions where those who speak the Eastern Khanty language.(2020/21); 65%-75% 15%-65%

- Eastern Khanty is classified as Severely Endangered by the UNESCO Atlas of the World's Languages in Danger (2010)

Eastern Khanty (ӄӑнтәк кӧԓ, қӑнтәк кӧԯ, pronounced [qɑntəɣ kɵɬ]) is a Uralic language, frequently considered a dialect of a Khanty language, spoken by about 1,000 people. The majority of these speakers speak the Surgut dialect, as the Vakh-Vasyugan and Salym varieties have been rapidly declining in favor of Russian. The former two have been used as literary languages since the late 20th century, with Surgut being more widely used due to its less isolated location and higher number of speakers.

== Classification ==
=== Dialects ===
Classification of Eastern Khanty dialects:

- Far Eastern (Vakh, Vasjugan, Verkhne-Kalimsk, Vartovskoe)
- Surgut (Jugan, Malij Jugan, Pim, Likrisovskoe, Tremjugan-Tromagan)

The Vakh, Vasyugan, Alexandrovo and Yugan (Jugan) dialects have less than 300 speakers in total.

==== Transitional ====
The Salym dialect can be classified as transitional between Eastern and Southern (Honti 1998 suggests closer affinity with Eastern, Abondolo 1998 in the same work with Southern). The Atlym and Nizyam dialects also show some Southern features.

==== Examples ====
- Surgut; Љаљ, икита пэканәта катԓәмтәта мосәԓ. (Ljalj, ikita pekanəta katłəmtəta mosəł.) ― The war has begun, men must take up arms
- Vakh; Пÿкинит ӛсäт пäни Ӄоԓӄǝт ӛсäт ǝйтхынǝ вǝлвǝлт. (Pükinit jəsät päni Ḳołḳǝt jəsät ǝjthynǝ wǝlwǝlt.)

== Phonology ==
Eastern Khanty [k] corresponds to [x] in the northern and southern languages.

=== Vakh ===
Vakh has the richest vowel inventory, with five reduced vowels /ĕ ø̆ ə̆ ɑ̆ ŏ/ and full /i y ɯ u e ø o æ ɑ/. Some researchers also report /œ ɔ/.

Vakh Khanty consonants
	Bilabial	Dental	Palatal/ized	Retroflex	Velar
Nasal	m	n	nʲ	ɳ	ŋ
Plosive	p	t	tʲ		k
Affricate			tʃ		
Fricative		s			ɣ
Lateral		l	lʲ	ɭ	
Trill		r			
Semivowel	w		j		

=== Surgut ===
Surgut Khanty has five reduced vowels /æ̆ ə̆ ɵ̆ ʉ̞̆ ɑ̆ ɔ̆ ʊ̆/ and full vowels /i e a ɒ̝ o u ɯ/.

Vowels
	Front	Central	Back	
	Front	Central	unrounded	rounded
Close	i (Note: These vowels can be found in non-first syllable positions.) iː ⟨и/ы⟩		ɯː ⟨ы⟩	uː ⟨у⟩
Near-close		ʉ̞̆ ⟨ӱ⟩		ʊ̆ ⟨ў⟩
Close-mid	e eː ⟨э/е⟩	ɵ̆ ⟨ӧ⟩		o oː ⟨ө⟩
Mid		ə̆ ⟨ә⟩		
Open-mid				ɔ̆ ⟨ө̆⟩
Open	æ̆ ~ ɛ ⟨ӓ⟩	ɐ ɐː ⟨а⟩	ɑ̆ ⟨ӑ⟩	ɒ̝ː ⟨o⟩

Consonants
		Bilabial	Dental / Alveolar	Palatal/ized	Post- alveolar	Velar	Uvular
Nasal		m ⟨м⟩	n̪ ⟨н⟩	nʲ ⟨њ⟩		ŋ ⟨ӈ⟩	
Plosive / Affricate		p ⟨п⟩	t̪ ⟨т⟩	tʲ ~ tɕ (Note: /tʲ/ can be realized as an affricate [tɕ] in the Tremjugan and Agan sub-dialects.) ⟨ᲊ⟩	tʃ ⟨ҷ⟩	k (Note: The velar/uvular contrast is predictable in inherited vocabulary: [q] appears before back vowels, [k] before front and central vowels. However, in loanwords from Russian, [k] may also be found before back vowels.) ⟨к⟩	q ⟨ӄ/қ⟩
Fricative	median		s ⟨с⟩		(ʃ) (Note: The phonemic status of [ʃ] is not clear. It occurs in some words in variation with [s], in others in variation with [tʃ].) ⟨ш⟩		ʁ ~ ɣ ⟨ӽ/ҳ⟩
Fricative	lateral		ɬ (Note: In the Pim sub-dialect, /ɬ/ has recently shifted to /t/, a change that has spread from Southern Khanty.) ⟨ԓ/ԯ⟩	ɬʲ ⟨љ⟩			
Approximant		w ~ β ⟨в⟩	l ⟨л⟩	j ⟨й⟩			(ʁ̞ʷ) (Note: The labialized postvelar approximant [ʁ̞ʷ] occurs in the Tremjugan sub-dialect as an allophone of /w/ between back vowels, for some speakers also word-initially before back vowels. Research from the early 20th century also reported two other labialized phonemes: /kʷ~qʷ/ and /ŋʷ/, but these are no longer distinguished.) ⟨ӽв/ҳв⟩
Trill			r ⟨р⟩				

== Alphabet ==
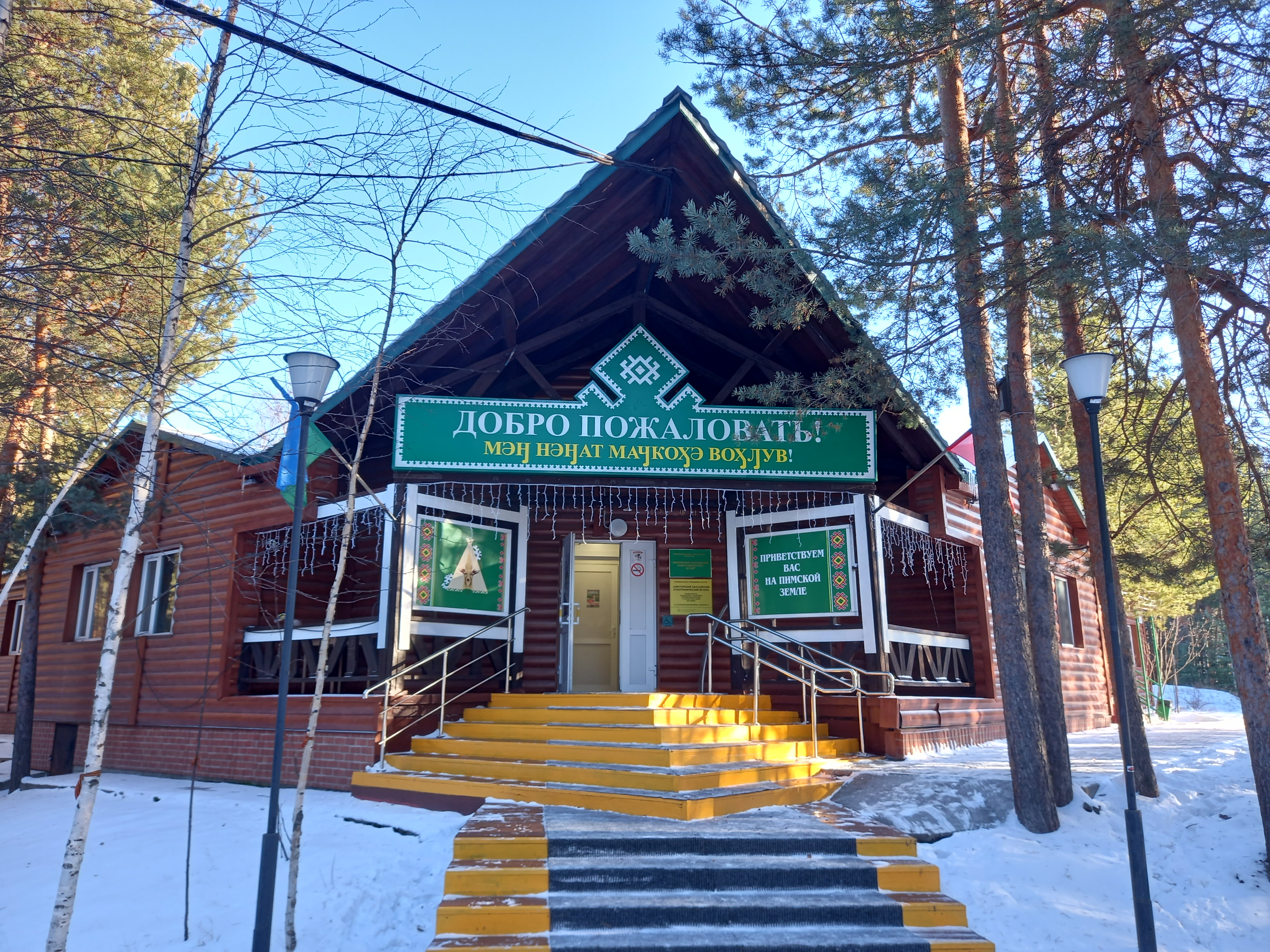
Bilingual Surgut Khanty-Russian sign at Lyantor museum, Khanty-Mansi Autonomous Okrug saying "МӘӇ НӘӇАТ МАЧ̡КOӼӘ ВOӼԒУВ"

Surgut alphabet (ԯ ң typeface)
А а	Ӑ ӑ	Ӓ ӓ	В в	И и	Й й	К к	Қ қ	Л л
Љ љ	Ԯ ԯ	М м	Н н	Њ њ	Ң ң	О о	Ө ө	Ө̆ ө̆
Ӧ ӧ	П п	Р р	С с	Т т	Ᲊ ᲊ	У у	Ў ў	Ӱ ӱ
Ҳ ҳ	Ҷ ҷ	Ш ш	Ы ы	Э э	Ә ә

Vakh-Vasyugan alphabet (ԯ ң typeface)
А а	Ӑ ӑ	Ӓ ӓ	В в	И и	Й й	К к	Қ қ	Л л
Ԯ ԯ	М м	Н н	Ң ң	О о	Ө ө	Ө̆ ө̆	Ӧ ӧ	П п
Р р	С с	Т т	У у	Ў ў	Ӱ ӱ	Ҳ ҳ	Ҷ ҷ	Ш ш
Ы ы	Э э	Ә ә	Ӛ ӛ	Я я	Ю ю

The Khanty letters with a tick or tail at bottom, namely Қ Ԯ Ң Ҳ Ҷ, are sometimes rendered with a diagonal tail, i.e. ⟨Ӆ Ӊ⟩, and sometimes with a curved tail, i.e. ⟨Ӄ Ӈ Ԓ Ӽ⟩. However, in the case of Surgut such graphic variation needs to be handled by the font, because there are no Unicode characters to hard-code Ҷ with a diagonal tail, and Unicode has refused a request to encode a variant of Ҷ with a curved tail ( , approximated in unicode as Ч̡ч̡), the reasoning being that it would be an allograph rather than a distinct letter. (The same is true of the other curved-tail variants in Unicode; those were encoded by mistake.)

== Grammar ==
The Vakh dialect is divergent. It has rigid vowel harmony and a tripartite (ergative–accusative) case system, where the subject of a transitive verb takes the instrumental case suffix -нә-, while the object takes the accusative case suffix. The subject of an intransitive verb, however, is not marked for case and might be said to be absolutive. The transitive verb agrees with the subject, as in nominative–accusative systems.

=== Nouns ===
Case and number inflection in Surgut Khanty of the word ӄот /qɒːt/ 'house'
		Number		
		Singular	Dual	Plural
Case	Nominative	ӄот house	ӄотӽән two houses	ӄотәт houses
Case	Dative + Lative	ӄота to the house	ӄотӽәна to the two houses	ӄотәта to the houses
Case	Locative	ӄотнә in the house	ӄотӽәннә in the two houses	ӄотәтнә in the houses
Case	Ablative	ӄоты from the house	ӄотӽәны from the two houses	ӄотәты from the houses
Case	Aproximative	ӄотнам towards the house	ӄотӽәннам towards the two houses	ӄотәтнам towards the houses
Case	Translative	ӄотӽә as the house	ӄотӽәнӽә as the two houses	ӄотәтӽә as the houses
Case	Instructive	ӄотат with the house	ӄотӽәнат with the two houses	ӄотәтат with the houses
Case	Comitative	ӄотнат with the house	ӄотӽәннат with the two houses	ӄотәтнат with the houses
Case	Abessive	ӄотԓәӽ without the house	ӄотӽәнԓәӽ without the two houses	ӄотәтԓәӽ without the houses

=== Pronouns ===
Personal Pronouns in Surgut Kanty
	Singular			Dual			Plural		
	1.	2.	3.	1.	2.	3.	1.	2.	3.
Nominative	mɐː	nʉŋ	ɬʉβ, ɬʉɣ	miːn	niːn	ɬiːn	məŋ	nəŋ, niŋ	ɬəɣ, ɬiɣ
Accusative	mɐːnt	nʉŋɐt	ɬʉβɐt ɬʉβət	miːnt miːnɐt	niːnɐt	ɬiːnɐt	məŋɐt	nəŋɐt	ɬəɣɐt
Dative	mɐːntem	nʉŋɐti	ɬʉβɐti	miːnɐtem miːntem minɐti	niːnɐti	ɬiːnɐti	məŋɐtem məŋɐti	nəŋɐti niŋɐti	ɬəɣɐti
Lative	mɐːntemɐ	nʉŋɐtinɐ nʉŋɐtenɐ nʉŋɐtijɐ	ɬʉβɐtiɬɐ ɬʉβɐtinɐ ɬʉβɐtɐ	miːnɐtemɐ miːntemɐ	niːnɐtinɐ niːnɐtenɐ niːnɐtijɐ	ɬiːnɐtiɬɐ ɬiːnɐtinɐ	məŋɐtinɐ məŋɐtemɐ	nəŋɐtinɐ nəŋɐtenɐ nəŋɐtijɐ	ɬəɣɐtiɬɐ ɬəɣɐtinɐ
Locative	mɐːntemnə mɐːnə, mɐːnnə mɐːn	nʉŋɐtinə nʉŋnə nʉŋən, nʉŋn	ɬʉβɐtiɬnə ɬʉβɐtinə ɬʉβnə, ɬʉβən	miːnɐtemnə miːntemnə miːnnə, miːnən	niːnɐtinnə niːnən	ɬiːnɐtiɬnə ɬiːnɐtinnə ɬiːnnə, ɬiːnən	məŋɐtemnə məŋɐtinnə məŋnə, məŋən	nəŋɐtinnə nəŋən, niŋnə	ɬəɣɐtiɬnə ɬəɣɐtinnə ɬəɣnə, ɬəɣən
Ablative	mɐːntemi mɐːni	nʉŋɐtini nʉŋɐteni nʉŋi	ɬʉβɐtiɬi ɬʉβɐtini ɬʉβɐti, ɬʉβi	miːnɐtemi miːntemi miːnɐti, miːni	niːnɐtini niːnɐteni niːni	ɬiːnɐtiɬi ɬiːnɐtini ɬiːnɐti, ɬiːni	məŋtemi məŋɐtini məŋɐti, məŋi	nəŋɐtini nəŋɐteni niŋɐtiji, nəŋi	ɬəɣɐtiɬi ɬəɣɐtini ɬəɣɐti, ɬəɣi
Aproximative	mɐːntemnɐm mɐːnnɐm	nʉŋɐtəɬnɐm nʉŋɐtinɐm nʉŋɐtenɐm nʉŋnɐm	ɬʉβɐtiɬnɐm ɬʉβɐtinɐm ɬʉβnɐm	miːnɐtemnɐm miːnɐtimənɐ miːnɐm	niːnɐtinɐm niːnɐtenɐm niːnɐnɐm	ɬiːnɐtiɬnɐm ɬiːnɐtinɐm ɬiːnɐtijɐt	məŋɐtemnɐm məŋɐtinɐm məŋnɐm	nəŋɐtinɐm niŋɐtinɐm nəŋɐtenɐm nəŋɐtijɐ	ɬəɣɐtiɬnɐm ɬəɣɐtinɐm ɬəɣnɐm
Translative	mɐːntemɣə mɐːnɣə	nʉŋɐtinɣə nʉŋɐtiɣə nʉŋɐtenɣə nʉŋkə	ɬʉβɐtiɬɣə ɬʉβɐtinɣə ɬʉβɐtiɣə ɬʉβkə	miːnɐtemɣə miːnɐtikkə miːnɣə	niːnɐtinɣə niːnɐtiɣə niːnɐtikkə niːnɣə	ɬiːnɐtiɬɣə ɬiːnɐtinɣə ɬiːnɐtikkə ɬiːnɣə	məŋtemɣə məŋɐtinɣə məŋɐtikkə məŋkə	nəŋɐtinɣə nəŋɐtiɣə nəŋɐtikkə nəŋkə	ɬəɣɐtiɬɣə ɬəɣɐtinɣə ɬəɣɐtikkə ɬəɣkə
Instructive	mɐːntemɐt	nʉŋɐtinɐt nʉŋɐtenɐt nʉŋɐtijɐt	ɬʉβɐtinɐt ɬʉβɐtiɬɐt ɬʉβɐtijɐt	miːntemɐt	niːnɐtinɐt niːnɐtenɐt niːnɐtijɐt	ɬiːnɐtinɐt ɬiːnɐtiɬɐt ɬiːnɐtijɐt	məŋɐtemɐt məŋɐteβɐt	nəŋɐtinɐt nəŋɐtenɐt nəŋɐtijɐt	ɬəɣɐtinɐt ɬəɣɐtiɬɐt ɬəɣɐtijɐt
Comitative	mɐːntemnɐt mɐːnnɐt	nʉŋɐtinɐt nʉŋɐtenɐt nʉŋnɐt	ɬʉβɐtiɬnɐt ɬʉβɐtəɬnɐt ɬʉβɐtinɐt ɬʉβnɐt	miːnɐtemnɐt miːntemnɐt miːnnɐt	niːnɐtinɐt niːnɐtenɐt niːnnɐt	ɬiːnɐtiɬɐt ɬiːnɐtinɐt ɬiːnnɐt	məŋɐtinɐt məŋɐtemnɐt məŋɐtiβnɐt məŋnɐt	nəŋɐtinɐt nəŋɐtenɐt nəŋnɐt	ɬəɣɐtiɬnɐt ɬəɣɐtinɐt ɬəɣnɐt
Abessive	mɐːntemɬəɣ	nʉŋɐtiɬəɣ nʉŋɐtinɬəɣ	ɬʉβɐtiɬəɣ						

Posessive in Surgut Kanty
			possessee		
			singular	dual	plural
possessor	1st person	singular	-əm	-ɣəɬɐm	-ɬɐm
possessor	1st person	dual	-imen	-ɣəɬəmən	-ɬəmən
possessor	1st person	plural	-iβ	-ɣəɬəβ	-ɬəβ
possessor	2nd person	singular	-ən, -ɐ, -ɛ	-ɣəɬɐ	-ɬɐ
possessor	2nd person	dual	-n	-ɣəɬən	-ɬən
possessor	2nd person	plural	-in	-ɣəɬən	-ɬən
possessor	3rd person	singular	-əɬ	-ɣəɬ	-ɬɐɬ
possessor	3rd person	dual	-in	-ɣəɬən	-ɬən
possessor	3rd person	plural	-iɬ	-ɣəɬ	-ɬɐɬ

=== Verbs ===
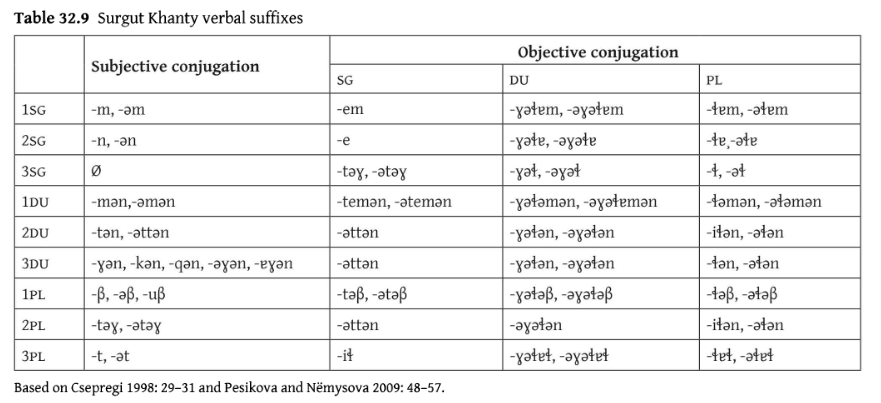
A table of verb suffixes in Khanty

Eastern Khanty verbs must agree with the subject in person and number. There are two paradigms for conjugation. Subjective conjugation agrees only with the subject, and objective conjugation agrees with both the subject and the object. In a sentence with both a subject and an object, the subjective conjugation puts the object in focus, and the objective conjugation puts the object as a topic.

== Vocabulary ==
=== Numerals ===
No.	Surgut Khanty numerals	Vakh Khanty numerals
1	әй (attributive), оԓәӈ (non-attributive)	ӛй
2	кат (attributive), катӽән (non-attributive)	кӓт, кӓ (attributive), кӓтӄӛн (non-attributive)
3	ӄөԓәм	коԓәм
4	њәԓә	нӛԓ, ньӛлӛ
5	вӓт	вет
6	ӄут	кут, ӄут
7	ԓапәт	лӓвӛт
8	њыԓәӽ	њыләӽ
9	ирйэӈ	ӛйӛрйöӈ
10	йэӈ	йöӈ
11	йэӈ ӱрәккә әй	
12	йэӈ ӱрәккә катӽән	
20	ӄөс	ӄос
25	ӄөс ӱрәккә вӓт	
30	ӄөԓәм йэӈ	
31	ӄөԓәм йэӈ әй	
40	њәԓә йэӈ	
42	њәԓә йэӈ катӽән	
80	њыԓсот	
100	сот	сат
255	кат сотӽән вӓт йэӈ вӓт	
800	њыԓәӽ сот	
1000	ᲊорас	тьәрәс
30943	ӄөԓәм йэӈ ᲊорас ирйэӈ сот њәԓә йэӈ ӄөԓәм	

=== Sample ===
English	Surgut Khanty	Vakh Khanty
Hello!	Пәҷа вө̆ԓа!	Пӛтьä вәла!
What is your name?	-	-
name	нӓм	нэм
fish	ӄуԓ	ӄул
house	ӄот	ӄут
woman	нэ, ими	ими
man	ӄө, ики	ики
child	њэврэм	ньӛӈи-ӄыи
river	йӑвән	йоӽәнʼ
