= Close back unrounded vowel =

Vowel sound represented by ⟨ɯ⟩ in IPA

ɯ
- IPA number: 316

Audio sample
- source · help

Encoding
- Entity (decimal): &#623;
- Unicode (hex): U+026F
- X-SAMPA: M
- Braille: ⠲ (braille pattern dots-256) ⠥ (braille pattern dots-136)
Image

IPA: Vowels

	Front	Central	Back
Close	i y	ɨ ʉ	ɯ u
Near-close	ɪ ʏ		ʊ
Close-mid	e ø	ɘ ɵ	ɤ o
Mid	e̞ ø̞	ə	ɤ̞ o̞
Open-mid	ɛ œ	ɜ ɞ	ʌ ɔ
Near-open	æ	ɐ
Open	a ɶ	ä	ɑ ɒ

- IPA help
- audio
- full chart
- template

Legend: unrounded • rounded

The close back unrounded vowel, or high back unrounded vowel, is a type of vowel sound used in some spoken languages. The symbol in the International Phonetic Alphabet that represents this sound is ⟨ɯ⟩. Typographically, it is a turned letter ⟨m⟩.

The close back unrounded vowel can in many cases be considered the vocalic equivalent of the voiced velar approximant [ɰ].

== Features ==
- Its vowel height is close, also known as high, which means the tongue is positioned close to the roof of the mouth without creating a constriction that would be classified as a consonant.
- Its vowel backness is back, which means the tongue is positioned back in the mouth without creating a constriction that would be classified as a consonant. Unrounded back vowels tend to be centralized, which means that often they are in fact near-back.
- Its place of articulation is velar, which means it is articulated with the back of the tongue (the dorsum) at the soft palate.
- It is unrounded, which means that the lips are not rounded.

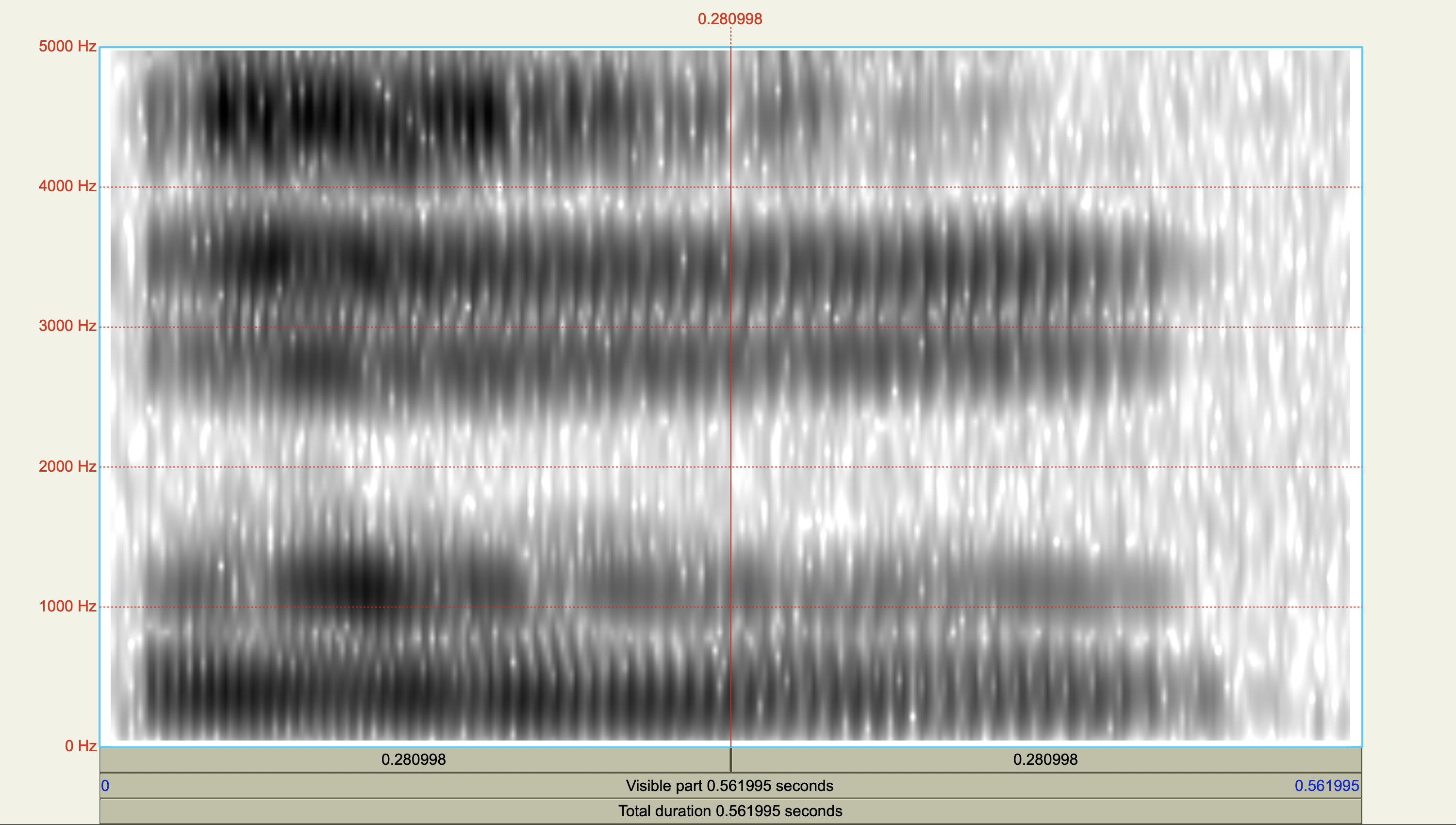
Spectrogram of [ɯ]

== Occurrence ==
Language		Word	IPA	Meaning	Notes
Acehnese		eu	[ɯ]	'see'	Also described as closer to [ɨ].
Arara		îput	[ɯput̚]	'my skin'	Frequent realisation of /ɨ/.
Arbëresh		Arbëreshë	[ɑɾbɯɾeʃ]	'Arbëreshë'	/ə/ in standard Albanian.
Azerbaijani		bahalı / باهالیٛ	[bɑhɑˈɫɯ]	'expensive'	Closer to an [ɘ].
Bashkir		ҡыҙ / قىُث / qıđ	[qɯð]	'girl'	
Chinese	Mandarin	刺 / cì	[t͡sʰɯ˥˩]	'thorn'	
Chinese	Wuhan dialect, Southwestern Mandarin	去 / keu	[kʰɯ]	'to go'	
Chinese	Some Wu dialects	父 / vu	[vɯ]	'father'	
Chinese	Xiang	火 / xu	[xɯ]	'fire'	
Chuvash		ыхра / ıxra	[ɯɣra]	'garlic'	
Crimean Tatar		джаным / canım	[dʒanɯm]	'my dear'	
English	Some California speakers	goose	[ɡɯˑs]	'goose'	Corresponds to [uː] in other dialects.
English	New Zealand	treacle	[ˈtɹ̝̊iːkɯ]	'treacle'	Possible realization of the unstressed vowel /ɯ/, which is variable in rounding and ranges from central to (more often) back and close to close-mid. Corresponds to /əl/ in other accents. Develops from dark L; See New Zealand English phonology
English	Some Philadelphia speakers	plus	[pɫ̥ɯs]	'plus'	Used by some speakers; the exact height and backness is variable. It corresponds to [ʌ] in other accents. See English phonology
English	South African	pill	[pʰɯ̞ɫ]	'pill'	Near-close; possible allophone of /ɪ/ before the velarised allophone of /l/. See South African English phonology
Eastern Khanty	Vakh-Vasyugan	пӛӈк	[pɯŋk]	'hazel grouse'	See Eastern Khanty phonology
Estonian		kõrv	[kɯrv]	'ear'	Typically transcribed in IPA with ⟨ɤ⟩; can be close-mid central [ɘ] or close-mid back [ɤ] instead, depending on the speaker. See Estonian phonology
Irish	Ulster	caol	[kʰɯːl̪ˠ]	'narrow'	See Irish phonology
Japanese		空気 / kūki	[kɯːkʲi]	'air'	May be compressed [ɯᵝ]. See Japanese phonology
Katukina			[babɯˈdʒɯ]	'oscar (fish)'	
Kazakh		қыс / qys / قىس	[qɯs]	'winter'	May be pronounced as qəs
Korean		음식 飮食 / eumsik	[ɯːmɕ͈ik̚]	'food'	See Korean phonology
Kurdish	Kurmanji (Northern)	tirş	[tˤɯɾʃ]	'sour'	See Kurdish phonology. The "i" after "t" always uses this sound if the "t" is "tˤ". However, it can also appear at other places.
Kurdish	Sorani (Central)	ترش / tirş	[tˤɯɾʃ]	'sour'	See Kurdish phonology. The "i" after "t" always uses this sound if the "t" is "tˤ". However, it can also appear at other places.
Kyrgyz		кыз / قىز / qyz	[qɯz]	'girl'	See Kyrgyz phonology
Livonian	Courland (Eastern)	kȭr	[kɯːr]	'wheel'	
Minangkabau	Some speakers	mandudu	[mändɯdɯ]	'to push ahead'	Normally [u] in standard Minangkabau language.
Panará			[tɯˈsəʰ]	'to breathe'	
Romanian	Some speakers	când	[kɯnd]	'when'	Typically described as ⟨ɨ⟩. See Romanian phonology
Scottish Gaelic		caol	[kʰɯːl̪ˠ]	'thin'	See Scottish Gaelic phonology
Sop		düm	[dɯm]	'tree'	See Sop language
Tamil		அழகு / aḻagu	[əɻəgɯ]	'beauty'	Normally [u] elsewhere.
Thai	Standard	ขึ้น / khuen/khîn	[kʰɯn˥˩]	'to go up'	
Turkish		sığ	[sɯː]	'shallow'	Described variously as close back [ɯ], near-close near-back [ɯ̽] and close central [ɨ]. See Turkish phonology
Turkmen		ýaşyl / یاشیٛل	[jɑːˈʃɯl]	'green'	
Uyghur		تىلىم / tılım/tilim	[tɯlɯm]	'my language'	In complementary distribution with /ɪ/. See Uyghur phonology
Vietnamese		tư	[tɯ]	'fourth'	See Vietnamese phonology

== Near-close near-back unrounded vowel ==
Near-close near-back unrounded vowel

ɯ̽

Audio sample
- source · help

Near-close back unrounded vowel

ɯ̞

ɤ̝

Some languages have a near-close near-back unrounded vowel, or near-high near-back unrounded vowel, which is more centralized than a typical [ɯ].

The International Phonetic Alphabet has no dedicated symbol for this sound, but it may be represented as [ɯ̽] (mid-centralized ⟨ɯ⟩) or [ɯ̞̈] (lowered and centralized ⟨ɯ⟩). It may also be transcribed as [ʊ̜] (less rounded ⟨ʊ⟩), but because ⟨ʊ⟩ is defined by the Handbook of the International Phonetic Association as rounded (whereas ⟨ə⟩ and ⟨ɐ⟩ do not specify rounding), the symbol [ʊ̜] can also signify a weakly rounded [ʊ], rather than the fully unrounded vowel that is described in this article. John C. Wells transcribes this vowel with the para-IPA symbol ⟨ω⟩ in his Accents of English, though Sinological phonetic notation uses this symbol instead for a near-open back rounded vowel [ɒ̝]. John Esling uses ⟨ᵻ⟩ to represent this sound in his iPA Phonetics mobile application, though this is more typically used to represent a near-close central unrounded vowel [ɪ̈].

For precision, a near-close back unrounded vowel, or near-high back unrounded vowel, may also be described, and is attested in a few spoken languages. This sound can be represented in the IPA as [ɯ̞] (lowered ⟨ɯ⟩) or [ɤ̝] (raised ⟨ɤ⟩). However, some phoneticians argue that all lip position inverses of the primary cardinal vowels are centralized (with the exception of ⟨ɒ⟩) based on formant acoustics, so that there may be no substantial difference between a near-close near-back unrounded vowel [ɯ̽] and its fully back counterpart [ɯ̞].

=== Features ===
- Its vowel height is near-close, also known as near-high, which means the tongue is not quite so constricted as a close vowel (high vowel).
- Its vowel backness is back, which means the tongue is positioned back in the mouth without creating a constriction that would be classified as a consonant. Unrounded back vowels tend to be centralized, which means that often they are in fact near-back.
- Its place of articulation is velar, which means it is articulated with the back of the tongue (the dorsum) at the soft palate.
- It is unrounded, which means that the lips are not rounded.

=== Occurrence ===
Language		Word	IPA	Meaning	Notes
English	African-American	hook	[hɯ̽k]	'hook'	Possible realization of /ʊ/.
English	California	hook	[hɯ̽k]	'hook'	Often pronounced with spread lips. Corresponds to /ʊ/ in other accents. See English phonology
English	Tidewater	hook	[hɯ̽k]	'hook'	May be rounded [ʊ] instead.
English	Cardiff	hook	[ɯ̽k]	'hook'	Also described as close-mid central [ɘ ~ ɵ].
English	New Zealand	treacle	[ˈtɹ̝̊iːkɯ̞]	'treacle'	Possible realization of the unstressed vowel /ɯ/, which is variable in rounding and ranges from central to (more often) back and close to close-mid. It corresponds to /əl/ in other accents. See New Zealand English phonology
English	Some Philadelphia speakers	plus	[pɫ̥ɯ̞s]	'plus'	Used particularly by male speakers; can be lower [ʌ̝ ~ ʌ] instead. It corresponds to [ʌ] in other accents. See English phonology
English	South African	pill	[pʰɯ̽ɫ]	'pill'	Possible allophone of /ɪ/ before the velarised allophone of /l/. Also described as close-mid [ɤ]. See South African English phonology
Irish	Ulster	ag gail	[ə ˈɡɯ̽lˠ]	'boiling'	Allophone of /ɪ/. See Irish phonology
Korean		어른/eoreun	[ə̝ːɾɯ̞n]	'seniors'	Typically transcribed in IPA with ⟨ɯ⟩. See Korean phonology
Portuguese	European	pegar	[pɯ̽ˈɣäɾ]	'to grab'	Typically transcribed in IPA with ⟨ɨ⟩ or ⟨ə⟩. Appears only in unstressed syllables. See Portuguese phonology
Scottish Gaelic	Lewis	gaol	[kɯ̽ːl̪ˠ]	'love'	Allophone of /ɯ/ when adjacent to velarized sonorants.
Turkish	Standard	sığ	[sɯ̽ː]	'shallow'	Also described as close back [ɯ] and close central [ɨ]. See Turkish phonology
Vietnamese	Hanoi	từ	[t̻ɯ̽˧˨]	'word'	Common allophone of /ɯ/. See Vietnamese phonology
Yine		[tɯ̽wɯ̽]		'salt'	Typically transcribed in IPA with ⟨ɯ⟩.

== See also ==
- Index of phonetics articles
- Ɯ

== Notes ==
Place →	Labial					Coronal										Dorsal					Laryngeal			
Manner ↓	Bilabial		Labiodental		Linguolabial		Dental		Alveolar		Postalveolar		Retroflex		(Alveolo-)palatal		Velar		Uvular		Pharyngeal/epiglottal		Glottal	
Nasal	m̥	m	ɱ̊	ɱ		n̼	n̪̊	n̪	n̥	n	n̠̊	n̠	ɳ̊	ɳ	ɲ̊	ɲ	ŋ̊	ŋ	ɴ̥	ɴ				
Plosive	p	b	p̪	b̪	t̼	d̼	t̪	d̪	t	d			ʈ	ɖ	c	ɟ	k	ɡ	q	ɢ	ʡ		ʔ	
Sibilant affricate							t̪s̪	d̪z̪	ts	dz	t̠ʃ	d̠ʒ	tʂ	dʐ	tɕ	dʑ								
Non-sibilant affricate	pɸ	bβ	p̪f	b̪v			t̪θ	d̪ð	tɹ̝̊	dɹ̝	t̠ɹ̠̊˔	d̠ɹ̠˔			cç	ɟʝ	kx	ɡɣ	qχ	ɢʁ	ʡʜ	ʡʢ	ʔh	
Sibilant fricative							s̪	z̪	s	z	ʃ	ʒ	ʂ	ʐ	ɕ	ʑ								
Non-sibilant fricative	ɸ	β	f	v	θ̼	ð̼	θ	ð	θ̠	ð̠	ɹ̠̊˔	ɹ̠˔	ɻ̊˔	ɻ˔	ç	ʝ	x	ɣ	χ	ʁ	ħ	ʕ	h	ɦ
Approximant		β̞		ʋ				ð̞		ɹ		ɹ̠		ɻ		j		ɰ						˷
Tap/flap		ⱱ̟		ⱱ					ɾ̥	ɾ			ɽ̊	ɽ						ɢ̆		ʡ̆		
Trill	ʙ̥	ʙ							r̥	r		r̠	ɽ̊r̥	ɽr					ʀ̥	ʀ	ʜ	ʢ		
Lateral affricate									tɬ	dɮ			tꞎ	d𝼅	c𝼆	ɟʎ̝	k𝼄	ɡʟ̝						
Lateral fricative							ɬ̪		ɬ	ɮ			ꞎ	𝼅	𝼆	ʎ̝	𝼄	ʟ̝						
Lateral approximant								l̪	l̥	l		l̠	ɭ̊	ɭ	ʎ̥	ʎ	ʟ̥	ʟ		ʟ̠				
Lateral tap/flap									ɺ̥	ɺ			𝼈̊	𝼈		ʎ̆		ʟ̆						

		BL	LD	D	A	PA	RF	P	V	U
Implosive	Voiced	ɓ			ɗ		ᶑ	ʄ	ɠ	ʛ
Implosive	Voiceless	ɓ̥			ɗ̥		ᶑ̊	ʄ̊	ɠ̊	ʛ̥
Ejective	Stop	pʼ			tʼ		ʈʼ	cʼ	kʼ	qʼ
Ejective	Affricate		p̪fʼ	t̪θʼ	tsʼ	t̠ʃʼ	tʂʼ	tɕʼ	kxʼ	qχʼ
Ejective	Fricative	ɸʼ	fʼ	θʼ	sʼ	ʃʼ	ʂʼ	ɕʼ	xʼ	χʼ
Ejective	Lateral affricate				tɬʼ			c𝼆ʼ	k𝼄ʼ	q𝼄ʼ
Ejective	Lateral fricative				ɬʼ					
Click (top: velar; bottom: uvular)	Tenuis	kʘ qʘ		kǀ qǀ	kǃ qǃ		k𝼊 q𝼊	kǂ qǂ		
Click (top: velar; bottom: uvular)	Voiced	ɡʘ ɢʘ		ɡǀ ɢǀ	ɡǃ ɢǃ		ɡ𝼊 ɢ𝼊	ɡǂ ɢǂ		
Click (top: velar; bottom: uvular)	Nasal	ŋʘ ɴʘ		ŋǀ ɴǀ	ŋǃ ɴǃ		ŋ𝼊 ɴ𝼊	ŋǂ ɴǂ	ʞ	
Click (top: velar; bottom: uvular)	Tenuis lateral				kǁ qǁ					
Click (top: velar; bottom: uvular)	Voiced lateral				ɡǁ ɢǁ					
Click (top: velar; bottom: uvular)	Nasal lateral				ŋǁ ɴǁ					
