= Oe with breve =

Cyrillic letter

- Ө̆ ө̆

Usage
- Writing system: Cyrillic
- Type: Alphabetic
- Sound values: /ø/

Oe with breve (Ө̆ ө̆; italics: Ө̆ ө̆) is a letter of the Cyrillic script used in the Surgut dialect of Khanty to represent the close-mid front rounded vowel /ø/.

== Computing codes ==
Oe with breve can be represented with the following Unicode characters :

Character information
Preview	Ө		ө		̆	
Unicode name	CYRILLIC CAPITAL LETTER; BARRED O		CYRILLIC SMALL LETTER; BARRED O		COMBINING BREVE	
Encodings	decimal	hex	dec	hex	dec	hex
Unicode	1256	U+04E8	1257	U+04E9	774	U+0306
UTF-8	211 168	D3 A8	211 169	D3 A9	204 134	CC 86
Numeric character reference	&#1256;	&#x4E8;	&#1257;	&#x4E9;	&#774;	&#x306;

== See also ==
- Ө ө : Cyrillic letter Oe
- Bar (diacritic)
- Breve
- Cyrillic script

== Bibliography ==
- Волкова, А. Н.; Соловар, В. Н. (2016). Краткий русско-хантыйский словарь (сургутский диалект) (PDF) (in Russian and Khanty). Khanty-Mansiysk: Югорский формат. ISBN 978-5-9907703-2-4. Archived from the original (PDF) on 2022-06-27.
- Волкова, А. Н.; Соловар, В. Н. (2018). Хантыйско-русский тематический словарь (сургутский диалект) (PDF) (in Russian and Khanty). Saint Petersburg: Издательство РГПУ им. А. И. Герцена. ISBN 978-5-8064-2560-8. Archived from the original (PDF) on 2023-11-11.
