= Sop language =

Rai Coast language spoken in Papua New Guinea

Sop
- Sob
- Native to: Papua New Guinea
- Region: Madang Province
- Native speakers: 2,300 (2003)
- Language family: Trans–New Guinea: Madang; Rai Coast; Peka; Sop

Language codes
- ISO 639-3: urw
- Glottolog: sopp1247

Sop (also Sob, Usino) is a Rai Coast language spoken in Madang Province, Papua New Guinea by approximately 2,500 people.

The Sob language has been labelled under several different names. Among the names are Usino, Usina, Sopu, and Igoi. Usino is the name of one of the villages and the name used for the government station. The speakers of this language do not recognize the name Usino as a name for their language, but use the endonym Sob.

== Phonology ==
=== Consonants ===
	Labial	Apical	Palatal	Velar
Plosive	p b	t d		k ɡ
Fricative	f	s		
Nasal	m	n		
Approximant	w		j	
Flap		ɾ		

- Where symbols appear in pairs the one to the left represents a voiceless consonant
- t, and d represent dental/alveolar/post-alveolar consonants, while n is only alveolar

=== Vowels ===
	Front	Back
High	i	ɯ <ü> u
Mid	e	o
Low		ɑ

== Syllabification ==
The canonical syllable profile of Sob is (C)V(C). Thus, vowels are required to have a nuclear vowel, and may optionally have an onset and/or coda. The overwhelming majority of syllables have an onset in Sob, forming the unmarked CV shape. Complex onsets and complex codas are disallowed for markedness.

Syllable types in Sob
	Single Syllable	#__$	$__$	$__#
V	e 'or'	e.ge 'eye'	keb fu.gi.a.ga 'light from fire'	fi.o 'fog'
CV	mi 'louse'	ta.ba 'head'	u.di.ge 'sand'	su.be 'mouth'
CVC	nur 'nose'	keb kaj 'water snake'	a.büs.kaj 'old woman'	si.bim 'stomach'
VC	am 'what'	ag.fe.re.a.ga 'he leads'	***	gi.tu.ar 'dusk'

== Personal pronouns ==
	Singular	Plural
1st	ye	sini (exclusive); sige (inclusive)
2nd	nag	nini; ninag
3rd	nu	nini
