= Bolshoy Salym =

Location
- Country: Russia

Physical characteristics
- Mouth: Ob
  - coordinates: 61.0969°N 70.9018°E
- Length: 583 km (362 mi)
- Basin size: 18,100 km^{2} (7,000 sq mi)

Basin features
- Progression: Ob→ Kara Sea

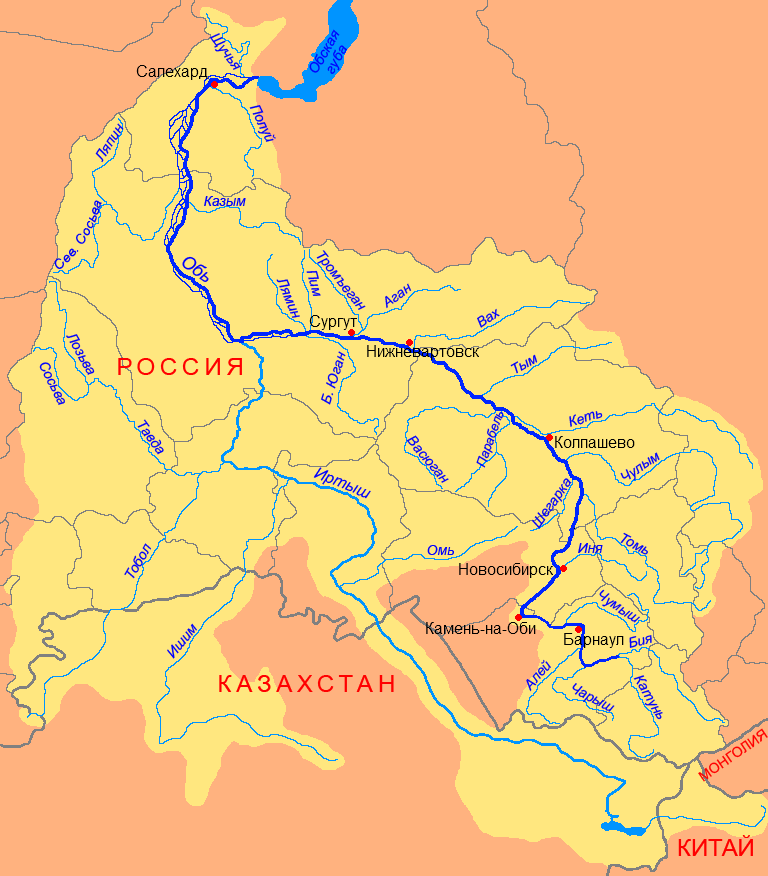
Ob River Basin Scheme

The Bolshoy Salym is a river in Khanty-Mansi Autonomous Okrug, Russia. It is a left tributary of the Ob. It is 583 kilometres (362 mi) long, and has a drainage basin of 18,100 square kilometres (7,000 sq mi).
