= Arran Gaelic =

Extinct dialect of Scottish Gaelic

- Scottish Gaelic: Gàidhlig Arainn
- Pronunciation: [ˈkaːlikʲ ˈɛɾiɲ]
- Region: Isle of Arran
- Extinct: 1977, with the death of Donald Craig
- Language family: Indo-European: Celtic; Insular Celtic; Goidelic; Scottish Gaelic; Arran Gaelic
- Early forms: Proto-Indo-European: Proto-Celtic; Proto-Goidelic; Primitive Irish

Language codes
- ISO 639-1: gd
- ISO 639-2: gla
- ISO 639-3: gla
- Glottolog: scot1245
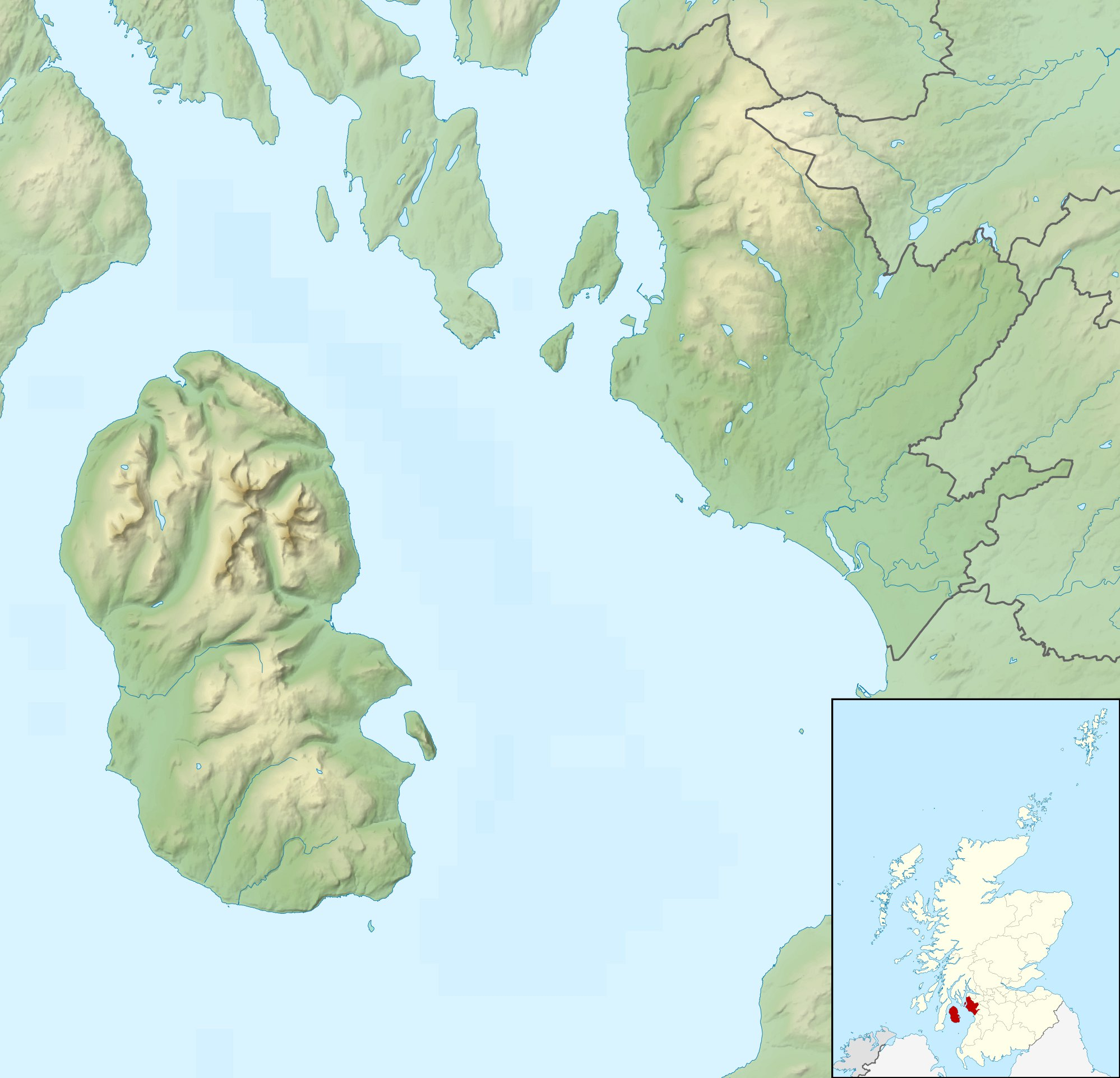

Arran Gaelic is an extinct dialect of Scottish Gaelic that was spoken on the Isle of Arran, and one of the last of the South Argyll dialects to go extinct.

== Pronunciation ==
Pronunciation
Scots Gaelic:	A' Chruach
Pronunciation:	[ə ˈxɾuəx]
Scots Gaelic:	Am Machaire
Pronunciation:	[ə ˈmaxəɾʲə]
Scots Gaelic:	Arainn nan Aighean Iomadh
Pronunciation:	[ˈaɾɪɲ ə ˈn̪ˠajən ˈiməɣ]
Scots Gaelic:	Arannach
Pronunciation:	[ˈaɾən̪ˠəx]
Scots Gaelic:	Beinn Bharrain
Pronunciation:	[peɲ ˈvarˠɛɲ]
Scots Gaelic:	Beinn Bhreac
Pronunciation:	[peɲ ˈvɾʲɛxk]
Scots Gaelic:	coinean mòr
Pronunciation:	[ˈkʰɔɲan ˈmoːɾ]
Scots Gaelic:	Eilean Arainn
Pronunciation:	[elan ˈaɾɪɲ]
Scots Gaelic:	Eilean na h-Àirde Bàine
Pronunciation:	[ˈelan ə ˈhaːrˠtʲə ˈpaːɲə]
Scots Gaelic:	Gleann Ròsa
Pronunciation:	[klɛun̪ˠ ˈrˠɔːs̪ə]
Scots Gaelic:	Gleann Sgoradail
Pronunciation:	[klaun̪ˠ ˈs̪kɔɾat̪al]
Scots Gaelic:	Gleann Shannaig
Pronunciation:	[klɛun̪ˠ ˈhan̪ˠɛkʲ]
Scots Gaelic:	Rubha na Cille
Pronunciation:	[ˈrˠu.ə nə ˈkʲʰiʎə]

The Arran dialect falls firmly into the southern group of Gaelic dialects (referred to as the "peripheral" dialects in Celtic studies) and thus shows:

- a glottal stop replacing an Old Irish hiatus, e.g. rathad 'road' /rɛʔət̪/ (normally /rˠa.ət̪/)
- the dropping of /h/ between vowels e.g. athair 'father' /aəɾ/ (normally /ahəɾʲ/)
- the preservation of a long l, n and r, e.g. fann 'weak' /fan̪ˠː/ (normally /faun̪ˠ/ with diphthongisation).

The most unusual feature of Arran Gaelic is the /w/ glide after labials before a front vowel, e.g. math 'good' /mwɛh/ (normally /mah/).

== History ==
Gaelic was still spoken widely on Arran at the beginning of the 20th century. The 1901 Census reported 25–49 per cent Gaelic speakers on the eastern side of the island and 50–74 per cent on the western side of the island. By 1921 the proportion for the whole island had dropped to less than 25 per cent. Nils Holmer quotes the Féillire (a Gaelic almanac) reporting 4,532 inhabitants on the island in 1931 with 605 Gaelic speakers, showing that Gaelic had declined to about 13 per cent of the population. It continued to decline until the last native speakers of Arran Gaelic died in the 1990s. Current Gaelic speakers on Arran originate from other areas in Scotland. In 2011, 2.0 per cent of Arran residents aged three and over could speak Gaelic.

== Documentation ==
Arran Gaelic is reasonably well documented. Holmer carried out field work on the island in 1938, reporting Gaelic being spoken by "a fair number of old inhabitants". He interviewed 53 informants from various locations and his description of The Gaelic of Arran was published in 1957 and runs to 211 pages of phonological, grammatical and lexical information. The Survey of the Gaelic Dialects of Scotland, which collected Gaelic dialect data in Scotland between 1950 and 1963, also interviewed five native speakers of Arran Gaelic.

Mac an Tàilleir notes that the island has a poetic name Arainn nan Aighean Iomadh – "Arran of the many stags" and that a native of the island or Arainneach is also nicknamed a coinean mòr in Gaelic, meaning "big rabbit". Locally, Arainn was pronounced /ɛɾɪɲ/.

== Extinction ==
The Scottish Gaelic dialect of Arran died out when the last speaker Donald Craig died in the 1970s. However, there is now a Gaelic House in Brodick, set up at the end of the 1990s.
