= Uyghur phonology =

This article covers the phonology of the Uyghur language. Uyghur, a Turkic language spoken primarily in the Xinjiang Uyghur Autonomous Region features both vowel harmony and vowel reduction.

== Vowels ==
| | Front | | Back | |
| | UR | R | UR | R |
|---|---|---|---|---|
| Close | ɪ | ʏ | (ɯ) | u |
| Mid | e | ø | | o |
| Open | æ | | ɑ | |

Uyghur vowels are by default short, but long vowels also exist because of historical vowel assimilation (above) and through loanwords. Underlyingly long vowels would resist vowel reduction and devoicing, introduce non-final stress, and be analyzed as |Vj| or |Vr| before a few suffixes. However, the conditions in which they are actually pronounced as distinct from their short counterparts have not been fully researched.

Official Uyghur orthographies do not mark vowel length, and also do not distinguish between /ɪ/ (e.g., بىلىم /bɪlɪm/ 'knowledge') and back /ɯ/ (e.g., تىلىم /tɯlɯm/ 'my language'); these two sounds are in complementary distribution, but phonological analyses claim that they play a role in vowel harmony and are separate phonemes.

The high vowels /ɪ/, /ʊ/, and /ʏ/ are devoiced in non-stressed positions when they occur between two voiceless consonants, or in word-initial position before a voiceless consonant: e.g. uka [ʊ̥kɑ] 'older brother', pütün [pʏ̥tʏn] 'entire', ikki [ɪ̥kkɪ] 'two'.

/e/ only occurs in words of non-Turkic origin and as the result of vowel raising.

=== Vowel reduction ===
Uyghur has two processes of systematic vowel reduction (or vowel raising):

1. Unrounded non-high vowels (/ɑ/ and /æ/) in initial open syllables followed by /ɪ/ are changed to /e/.
2. Unrounded vowels in other non-final open syllables are changed to /ɪ/.

The former process is applied before the latter; As with other phenomena, long vowels are exempt. For example:

/ɑl + ɪŋ/ → /elɪŋ/ (cf. Turkish alın) 'take!'
/ɑtɑ + lɑr + ɪmɪz/ → /ɑtɪlɪrɪmɪz/ (cf. Turkish atalarımız) 'our fathers' (not *[etɪlɪrɪmɪz] in Uyghur because reduction to /e/ can only be applied before reduction to /ɪ/ in a word)
/ɑt + ɪm/ → /etɪm/ (cf. Turkish atım) 'my horse')
/pæːr + ɪm/ → /pæ(ː)rɪm/ 'my feather' (in some loanwords, vowel raising does not occur)

=== Vowel harmony ===
Uyghur, like other Turkic languages, displays vowel harmony. Words usually agree in vowel backness, but compounds, loans, and some other exceptions often break vowel harmony. Suffixes surface with the rightmost [back] value in the stem, and /e, ɪ/ are transparent (as they don't contrast for backness). Uyghur also has rounding harmony.

== Consonants ==
| | Labial | | Dental | | Post-alv./ Palatal | | Velar | | Uvular | | Glottal |
|---|---|---|---|---|---|---|---|---|---|---|---|
| Nasal | | m | | n | | | | ŋ | | | |
| Stop | p | b | t | d | t͡ʃ | d͡ʒ | k | ɡ | q | ʁ | ʔ |
| Fricative | (f) | (v) | s | z | ʃ | ʒ | x | | q | ʁ | h |
| Trill | | | | r | | | | | | | |
| Approximant | | | | l | | j | | w | | | |

Uyghur voiceless stops are aspirated word-initially and intervocalically. The pairs /p, b/, /t, d/, /k, ɡ/, and /q, ʁ/ alternate, with the voiced member devoicing in syllable-final position, except in word-initial syllables. This devoicing process is usually reflected in the official orthography, but an exception has been recently made for certain Perso-Arabic loans. Voiceless phonemes do not become voiced in standard Uyghur.

Suffixes display a slightly different type of consonant alternation. The phonemes /ɡ/ and /ʁ/ anywhere in a suffix alternate as governed by vowel harmony, where /ɡ/ occurs with front vowels and /ʁ/ with back ones. Devoicing of a suffix-initial consonant can occur only in the cases of /d/ → [t], /ɡ/ → [k], and /ʁ/ → [q], when the preceding consonant is voiceless. Lastly, the rule that /ɡ/ must occur with front vowels and /ʁ/ with back vowels can be broken when either [k] or [q] in suffix-initial position becomes assimilated by the other due to the preceding consonant being such.

Stops and affricates lenite when preceding a dissimilar consonant. /t͡ʃ/ goes to [ʃ], /d͡ʒ/ to [ʒ], /k/ to [ç], and /q/ to [χ]. /ɡ/ goes to [ɣ] in word-initial syllables, but in non-initial syllables, /ɡ/ and /ʁ/ behave like their unvoiced equivalents and go to [ç] and [χ] respectively. These changes are not reflected in orthography, except when /b/ lenites to [v] or [w] as ⟨w⟩. Similarly, /h/ tends to become [χ] before another consonant. Lenition also occurs in certain intervocalic contexts, e.g. /b/ lenites to [β] and /ɡ/ as [ɣ] (not marked).

Uyghur displays vocalic assimilation, atypical among Turkic languages. Syllable-final /r/, /l/, and /j/ are optionally assimilated to the preceding vowel which is lengthened, in the case of e and u, made lower and less tense; e.g., xelqler [xæːqlæː] ‘the nations’. However, this never occurs when /l/ and /j/ are word final. This phenomenon occurs most common in colloquial speech, but is often avoided when reciting, reading, or singing. As a result, Uyghur speakers often hypercorrect by inserting an [r] after a long vowel where there is no phonemic /r/, especially after attaching a vowel-initial suffix (e.g. bina 'building', binarim or binayim 'my building'). In addition, although this is not represented orthographically, a few cases of "r-deletion" have been lexicalized, such as تۆت töt ('four').

Loan phonemes have influenced Uyghur to various degrees. /d͡ʒ/ and /x/ were borrowed from Arabic and have been nativized, while /ʒ/ from Persian less so. /f/ only exists in very recent Russian and Chinese loans, since Perso-Arabic (and older Russian and Chinese) /f/ became Uyghur /p/. Perso-Arabic loans have also made the contrast between /k, ɡ/ and /q, ʁ/ phonemic, as they occur as allophones in native words, the former set near front vowels and the latter near a back vowels. Some speakers of Uyghur distinguish /v/ from /w/ in Russian loans, but this is not represented in most orthographies. Other phonemes occur natively only in limited contexts, i.e. /h/ only in few interjections, /d/, /ɡ/, and /ʁ/ rarely initially, and /z/ only morpheme-final. Therefore, the pairs */t͡ʃ, d͡ʒ/, */ʃ, ʒ/, and */s, z/ do not alternate.

== Phonotactics ==
The primary syllable structure of Uyghur is CV(C)(C). Uyghur syllable structure is usually CV or CVC, but CVCC can also occur in some words. When syllable-coda clusters occur, CC tends to become CVC in some speakers especially if the first consonant is not a sonorant. In Uyghur, any consonant phoneme can occur as the syllable onset or coda, except for /ʔ/ which only occurs in the onset and /ŋ/, which never occurs word-initially. In general, Uyghur phonology tends to simplify phonemic consonant clusters by means of elision and epenthesis.
