= Southern Hebridean dialect group =

Group of dialects of Scottish Gaelic

The Southern Hebridean dialect group is a group of dialects of Scottish Gaelic. The Southern Hebridean dialects are spoken in the Outer Hebrides south of Lewis, that being the islands of Harris, Uist and Barra, as well as surrounding smaller islands such as Berneray and Eriskay. The dialect of Skye is closely related to this dialect group and shares many of its features, as are the west coast mainland dialects of Glenelg, Mallaig and Arisaig.

The group is generally subdivided dialectally into its individual islands, though the distinction between the individual Uist islands is less clear.

== Phonological characteristics ==
- Back realisation of /u/, compared to the central realisation as [ʉ] found in Lewis.
- Preaspiration is a strong [h] before t and p, and [x] or [ç] before c.
  - In Uist and Barra the sequences lc and rc feature preaspiration, e.g. olc 'evil' /ɔl̪ˠxk/, but in Harris it is unaspirated as in Lewis.
- Presence of voiced plosive consonants in certain post-nasal situations, e.g. an cat 'the cat' [ə ˈŋɡʰaht̪].
- Plosives dominant over nasals when nasalised; they can even eclipse them entirely, e.g. sam bith 'any' [s̪ə ˈb̥ih].
- Realisation of eò as [eɔː] or [æɔː], whereas in many other dialects the e represents a semivowel or consonant [j].
- Realisation of ea as /e/ before /s/ or /t̪/.
- Strict retention of final schwa, with even some examples of paragoge, e.g. realisation of eanchainn as eanchainne in Barra.
- Dropping of initial f in fèileadh 'kilt' /ˈeiləɣ/.

== Morphological characteristics ==
Southern Hebridean dialects have a general strong tendency towards grammatical conservatism, which particularly manifests in certain features as follows:

- The use of the -(e)adh ending in the singular genitive case, particularly in feminine nouns, e.g. cloicheadh 'stone' (gen.) /ˈkʰl̪ˠɔçəɣ/; when followed by an adjective, the /ɣ/ is elided from the noun and added to the end of the adjective.
- An archaic -(a)idh ending in the singular dative case, particularly in feminine nouns, e.g. teinidh 'fire' (dat.).
- Consistent formation of the genitive singular and plural forms in masculine nouns ending in -an by slenderisation.
- Use of the synthetic form in the first-person plural of the conditional and imperative grammatical moods, e.g. bhitheamaid 'would be'.
- Semantic distinction between duilich 'sorry' and doirbh 'hard, difficult', which are both expressed as duilich in Lewis.

However, certain features are innovative:

- The prepositions tro 'through' and ro 'before' are merged as ro.
