= Languages of Russia =

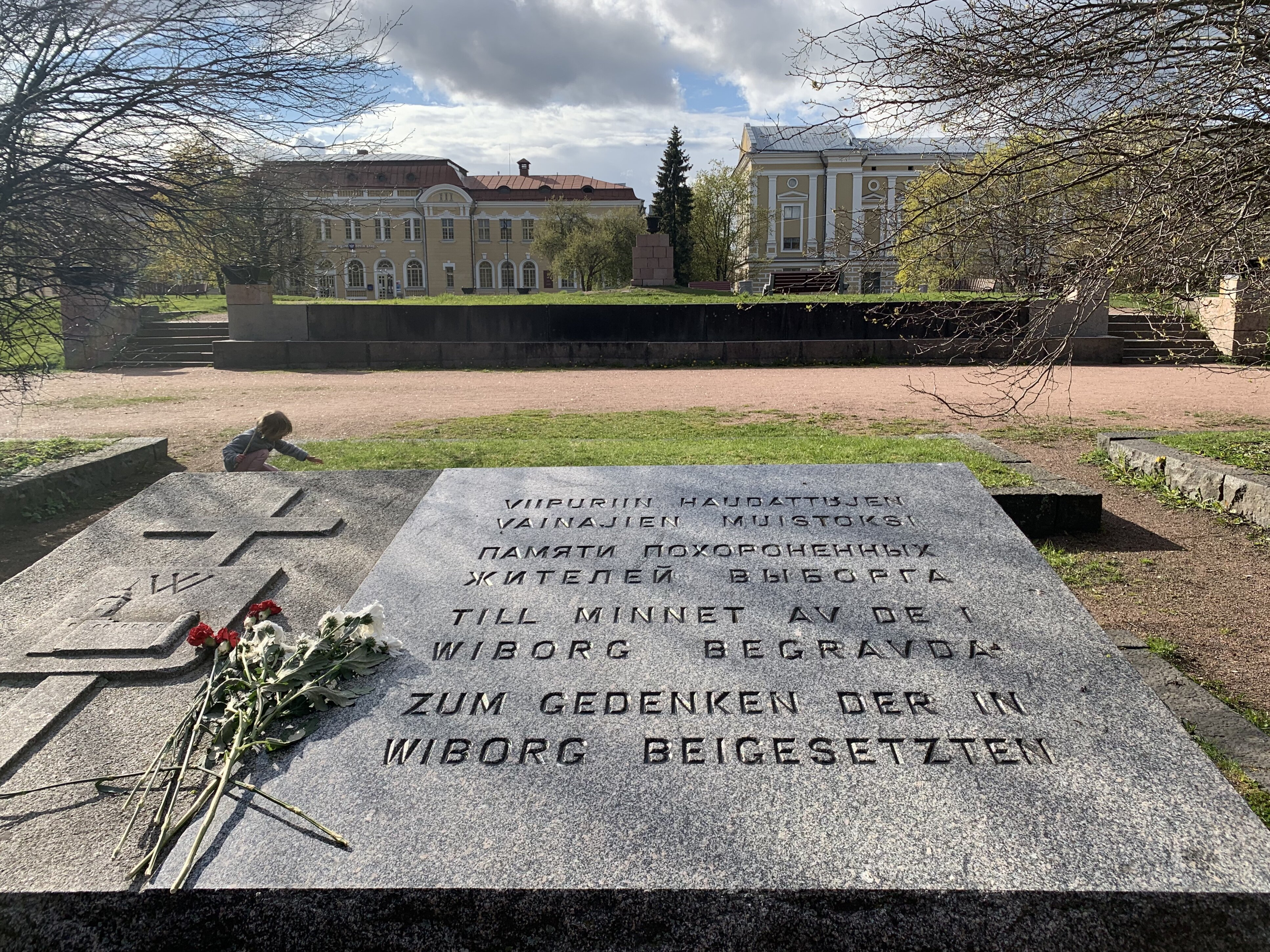
- Memorial in Vyborg in Finnish, Russian, Swedish and German.
- Official: Russian
- Semi-official: Thirty-five languages
- Minority: Dozens of languages of the Indo-European, Northeast Caucasian, Northwest Caucasian, Uralic, Turkic, Mongolic, Tungusic and Paleosiberian language families
- Foreign: 13–20% have foreign language knowledge: 1. English (71% out of all foreign language speakers or 15% of the population; 30% to some degree.; 2. German (16%); 3. Ukrainian (9%); 4. Azerbaijani, French & Turkish (3%); 5. Others (20%) (Note: Including 1% Russian)
- Signed: Russian Sign Language
- Keyboard layout: Russian keyboard

Of all the languages of Russia, Russian, the most widely spoken language, is the only official language at the national level. There are 25 other official languages, which are used in different regions of Russia. These languages include; Ossetic, Ukrainian, Belarusian, Buryat, Kalmyk, Chechen, Ingush, Abaza, Adyghe, Tsakhur, Lezgian, Cherkess, Kabardian, Altai, Bashkir, Chuvash, Crimean Tatar, Karachay-Balkar, Khakas, Nogai, Tatar, Tuvan, Yakut, Erzya, Komi, Hill Mari, Meadow Mari, Karelian, Moksha, Veps, Ingrian, Ludian, and Udmurt. There are over 100 minority languages spoken in Russia today.

== Official languages ==
Although Russian is the only official language of Russia at the federal level, there are several other officially recognized languages within Russia's various constituencies – article 68 of the Constitution of Russia only allows the various republics of Russia to establish official languages other than Russian. This is a list of the languages that are recognized as official in constitutions of the republics of Russia, as well as the number of native speakers according mostly to the 2010 census or more recent ones:

Language	Language family	Federal subject(s)	Speakers in Russia	Source
Tatar	Turkic	Tatarstan	4,280,718 (2010 Census)	
Chechen	Northeast Caucasian	Chechnya; Dagestan	1,354,705 (2010 census)	
Bashkir	Turkic	Bashkortostan	1,152,404 (2010 census)	see also regional law
Ukrainian	Indo-European	Republic of Crimea (Note: Annexed by Russia in 2014; recognized as a part of Ukraine by most of the UN Member States.)	1,129,838 (2010 census)	
Chuvash	Turkic	Chuvashia	1,042,989 (2010 census)	
Avar	Northeast Caucasian	Dagestan	715,297 (2010 census)	
Kabardian (East Circassian)	Northwest Caucasian	Kabardino-Balkaria; Karachay-Cherkessia	590,000 (2010 census)	
Hill Mari, Meadow Mari	Uralic	Mari El	470,000 (2012)	
Ossetian	Indo-European	North Ossetia–Alania	451,431 (2010 census)	
Yakut	Turkic	Sakha	450,140 (2010 census)	
Kumyk	Turkic	Dagestan	426,212 (2010 census)	
Lezgi	Northeast Caucasian	Dagestan	402,173 (2010 census)	
Ingush	Northeast Caucasian	Ingushetia	305,868 (2010 census)	
Udmurt	Uralic	Udmurtia	324,338 (2010 census)	
Karachay-Balkar	Turkic	Kabardino-Balkaria; Karachay-Cherkessia	305,364 (2010 census)	
Crimean Tatar	Turkic	Republic of Crimea	308,000 (2010 census) 228,000 (2019)	
Tuvan	Turkic	Tuva	280,000 (2010)	
Buryat	Mongolic	Buryatia	265,000 (2010 census)	
Komi-Zyrian	Uralic	Komi Republic	160,000 (2010 census)	
Moksha	Uralic	Mordovia	130,000 (2010 census)	
Adyghe	Northwest Caucasian	Adygea	128,000 (2015)	
Azerbaijani	Turkic	Dagestan	116,907 (2020–2021 census)	
Nogai	Turkic	Karachay-Cherkessia; Dagestan	87,119 (2010 census)	
Kalmyk	Mongolic	Kalmykia	80,546 (2010 census)	
Altai	Turkic	Altai Republic	55,720 (2010 census)	
Abaza	Northwest Caucasian	Karachay-Cherkessia	37,831 (2010 census – 2014)	
Erzya	Uralic	Mordovia	36,726 (2010 census)	
Khakas	Turkic	Khakassia	43,000 (2010 census)	
Karelian	Uralic	Karelia	around 14,000 (2020–2021 census)	

Dagestan's constitution defines "Russian and the languages of the peoples of Dagestan" as the state languages. 14 of these languages (including Russian) are literary written languages; therefore they are commonly considered to be the official languages of Dagestan. These are, besides Russian, the following: Aghul, Avar, Azerbaijani, Chechen, Dargwa, Kumyk, Lak, Lezgian, Nogai, Rutul, Tabasaran, Tat and Tsakhur. All of these, except Russian, Chechen and Nogai, are official only in Dagestan and in no other Russian republic. In the project of the "Law on the Languages of the Republic of Dagestan", 32 languages are listed; however, this law project never came to life.

Karelia is the only republic of Russia with Russian as the only official language. However, there exists the special law about state support and protection of the Karelian, Vepsian and Finnish languages in the republic.

== Other recognized languages ==
The Government of the Republic of Bashkortostan adopted the "Law on the Languages of Nations", which is one of the regional laws aimed at protecting and preserving minority languages. In Bashkortostan, the equality of the languages is recognized. Equality is a combination of the rights of peoples and people to preserve and fully develop their native language, and freedom of choice and use of the language of communication. The writing of names of geographical objects and the inscription, road and other signs along with the state language of Bashkortostan can be done in the languages of Bashkortostan in the territories where they are concentrated. Similar laws were adopted in Mari El, Tatarstan, Udmurtia, Khakassia and the Chukotka Autonomous Okrug.

The federal law "On the Languages of the Peoples of the Russian Federation", adopted in 1991, allows the federal subjects to establish additionally official languages in the areas where minority groups live. The following 15 languages benefit from various degrees of recognition in various regions under this law:

- Buryat in the Agin-Buryat Okrug
- Chukchi in Sakha
- Dolgan in Sakha
- Even in Sakha
- Evenki in Sakha
- Finnish in Karelia
- Karelian in Karelia
- Kazakh in Altai
- Khanty in the Khanty-Mansi Autonomous Okrug and the Yamalo-Nenets Autonomous Okrug
- Komi-Permyak in the Komi-Permyak Okrug
- Mansi in the Khanty-Mansi Autonomous Okrug
- Nenets in the Khanty-Mansi Autonomous Okrug, the Nenets Autonomous Okrug and the Yamalo-Nenets Autonomous Okrug
- Selkup in the Yamalo-Nenets Autonomous Okrug
- Veps in Karelia
- The Yukaghir languages in Sakha

== Migrant languages ==
As a result of mass migration to Russia from the former republics of the Soviet Union, especially from the Caucasus and Central Asia, many non-indigenous languages are spoken by migrant workers. For example, in 2014, 2.4 million Uzbek citizens and 1.2 million Tajik citizens entered Russia.

== Endangered languages in Russia ==
There are many endangered languages in Russia. Some are considered to be near extinction and put on the list of endangered languages in Russia, and some may have gone extinct since data was last reported. On the other hand, some languages may survive even with few speakers.

Some languages have doubtful data, like Serbian whose information in the Ethnologue is based on the 1959 census.

=== Languages near extinction ===
Most numbers are according to Michael Krauss (1995). Given the time that has passed, languages with extremely few speakers might be extinct today. Since 1994, Kerek, Aleut (in Russia), Medny Aleut, Akkala Sami, Oroch and Yugh have become extinct.

- Enets (70)
- Ingrian (100)
- Negidal
- Orok (30–82)
- Sami, Ter (2)
- Tofalar (25–30)
- Udege (100)
- Votic (8, 60 non-native)
- Ket (20 speakers) (2019)
- Yukaghir, Northern (30–150)
- Yukaghir, Southern (10–50)
- Yupik (550-900)

== Foreign languages ==
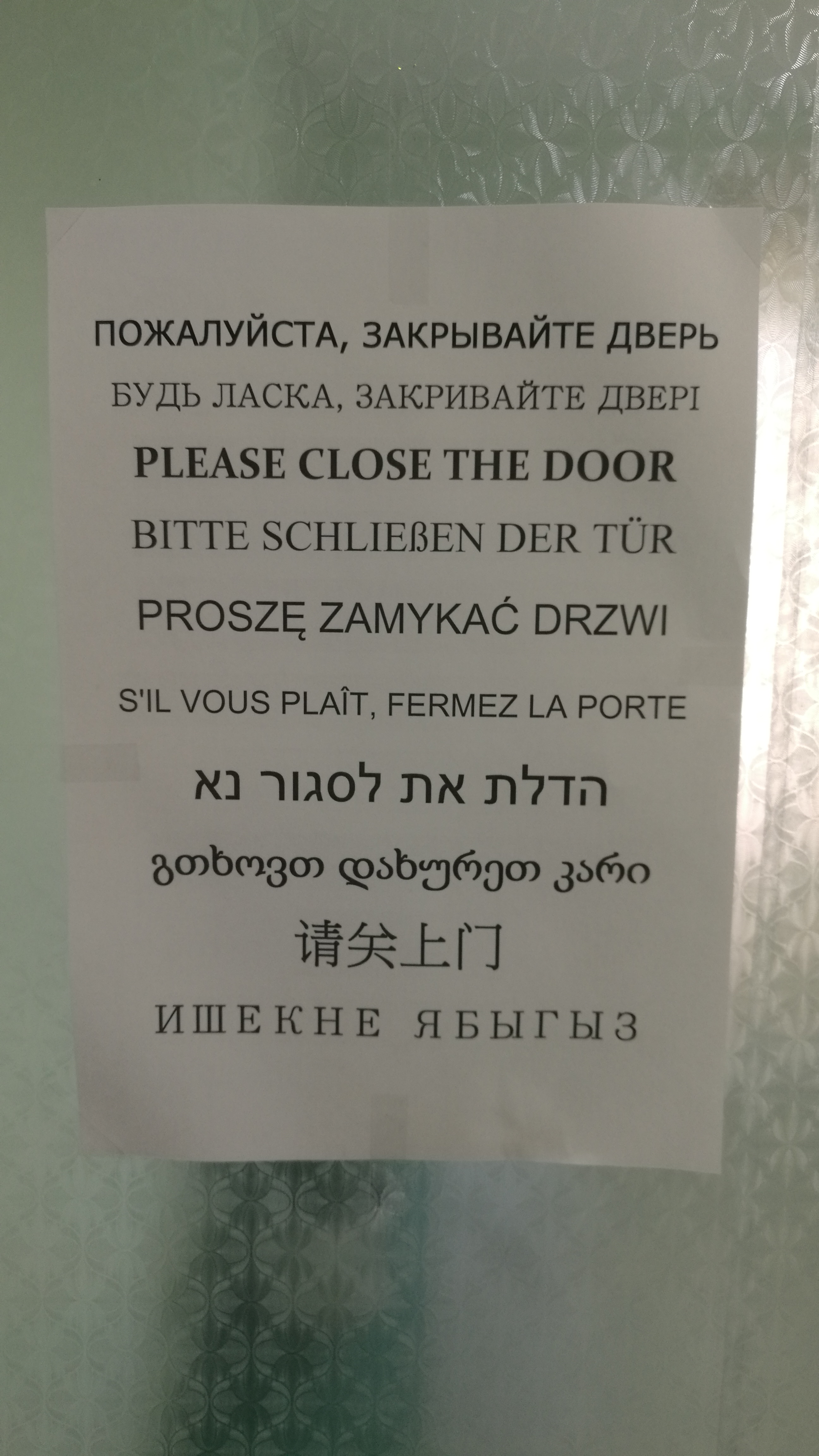
Sign at TyumenNIIgiprogas headquarters reflecting the international nature of the oil industry: it is in Russian, Ukrainian, English, German, Polish, French, Hebrew, Georgian, Chinese and Tatar.

According to the various studies made in 2005–2008 by Levada Center, 15% of Russians know a foreign language. From those who claim knowledge of at least one language:

"Can speak freely":
English	80%
German	16%
French	4%
Turkish	2%
Others	9%
From 1775 respondents aged 15-29, November 2006

"Know enough to read newspapers":
English	44%
German	15%
Ukrainian, Belarusian and other Slavic languages	19%
Other European languages	10%
All others	29%
From 2100 respondents of every age, January 2005

Knowledge of at least one foreign language is common among younger and middle-aged people. Among those aged 18–24, 38% can read and "translate with a dictionary", 11% can freely read and speak. Among those aged 25–39, these numbers are 26% and 4% respectively.

Knowledge of a foreign language varies among social groups. It is most appreciable (15-18%) in big cities with 100,000 or more inhabitants, while in Moscow it rises up to 35%. People with higher education and high economic and social status are more likely to know a foreign language.

The new study by Levada-Center in April 2014 reveals such numbers:

Can speak freely at least one language:
English	11%
German	2%
Spanish	2%
Ukrainian	1%
French	<1%
Chinese	<1%
Others	2%
Can speak a foreign language but with difficulty	13%
Do not speak a foreign Language at all	70%
From 1602 respondents from 16 and older, April 2014

The age and social profiling are the same: knowledge of a foreign language is predominant among the young or middle-aged population, those with a high level of education and high social status, and those who live in big cities.

In 2015, a survey taken in all federal subjects of Russia showed that 70% of Russians could not speak a foreign language. Almost 30% could speak English, 6% could speak German, 1% could speak French, 1% could speak Spanish, 1% could speak Arabic and 0.5% could speak another language.

Language	% of speakers in Russia (2003)	% of speakers in Russia (2015)	Change (%)
English	16	30	▲14
German	7	6	▼1
French	1	1	Steady

=== English ===
Knowledge	Percentage
Can speak English to a degree	30%
Can read and translate using a dictionary	20%
Can understand colloquial language	7%
Can speak very fluently	3%

=== History ===
In the 18th and 19th centuries, French was a common language among upper class Russians. The impetus came from Peter the Great's orientation of Russia towards Europe and accelerated after the French Revolution. After the Russians fought France in the Napoleonic Wars, Russia became less inclined towards French.

== Languages of education ==
Every year, the Ministry of Education and Science publishes statistics on the languages used in schools. In 2014/2015 the absolute majority (13.1 million or 96%) of 13.7 million Russian students used Russian as a medium of education. Around 1.6 million or 12% students studied their (non-Russian) native language as a subject. The most studied languages are Tatar, Chechen and Chuvash with 347,000, 253,000 and 107,000 students respectively.

The most studied foreign languages in 2013/2014 were as follows:

Language	Students (in thousands)
English	11,194.2
German	1,070.5
French	297.8
Spanish	20.1
Chinese	14.9
Arabic	3.4
Italian	2.9
Others	21.7

== See also ==
- Demography of Russia
- List of languages of Russia
- Languages of the Caucasus
- Russian Academy of Sciences, the language regulator in Russia
