= 2021 Russian census =

Third census of the Russian Federation population

- 15 October – 14 November 2021
- Logo

General information
- Country: Russia
- Authority: Rosstat
- Website: Strana2020.ru

Results
- Total population: 147,182,123

The 2021 Russian census (Russian: Всероссийская перепись населения 2021 года, romanized: Vserossiyskaya perepis naseleniya 2021 goda, lit. '2021 All-Russian population census') was the first census of the Russian Federation population since 2010 and the third after the dissolution of the Soviet Union. It took place between October 15 and November 14. However, for the remote and inaccessible areas of Russia, the census took place between April 1 and December 20.

The preparations for the census started in 2017 with the adoption of the government decree "On the conduct of the Russian Population Census 2020". According to Pavel Malkov, head of Rosstat, the budget allocated for the 2020 census was 33 billion rubles. The motto of the census was "Create the future!".

On June 25, 2020, Rosstat announced its intention to conduct the main stage of the Russian population census in April 2021, and on June 29 this was confirmed. Due to the spread of COVID-19, the census dates were shifted several times, first to April, then to October 2021. The results have come under scrutiny due to a lack of participation within the census. Rosstat maintains that 99% of the population completed the census however the Levada Center estimated that around 42% of the population was not enumerated and has described the results as "one of the worst in 150 years".

== Pilot census 2018 ==
The pilot census was conducted from October 1 to October 31, 2018. The main purpose was the development and testing of software and methodological, organizational and technological issues of the 2020 Census, taking into account the use of new methods of collecting information. The pilot census was divided into three stages: October 1–10 — online census; October 16–27 — door-to-door rounds; October 27–31 — control walk.

10 territories were allocated for the pilot census, the total population of which was about 550,000 people. These territories include:

- Elbrussky District, Kabardino-Balkaria
- Khangalassky District, Sakha
- Aleutsky District, Kamchatka Krai
- Minusinsk, Krasnoyarsk Krai
- Nizhneudinsky and Katangsky Districts, Irkutsk Oblast
- Veliky Novgorod
- Yuzhno-Kurilsky District, Sakhalin Oblast
- Sviblovo District, Moscow
- Knyazhevo municipality, St. Petersburg

In addition to the census through the State Services portal, for the first time in Russian history, the national postal operator Russian Post was involved in the census. According to the results of the 2018 pilot census, nearly 460,000 households were enumerated in electronic form with more than 1.2 million inhabitants.

== Updating the information ==
In August 2019, in preparation for the 2020 census, work began to update the address lists in cities and rural areas. Based on the work of the registrars, the exact number of houses in each city and their location were determined. Later, Rosstat specialists conducted zoning to form enumeration and census areas. So, thanks to the registrars, a previously not documented village of Yozhikovo was "discovered" in Ruzsky District and two new ones in Udmurtia:

== Questions ==
The census forms of standard "L", "P" and "V" were approved by the Government. The same questions are printed in paper questionnaires and are used in electronic tablets.

- L-form — designed to be filled in for persons permanently residing in Russia
- P-form — filled in for the premises and characterizes the living conditions of the people
- V-form — filled in for persons temporarily staying in the territory of Russia at the time of the census, but permanently residing abroad.

== Format ==
All inhabited areas were visited by census takers from October 15 to November 14, 2021. They had electronic tablets where the respondents' answers were entered. Residents of Russia also were able to come to the census stations and answer the questions there; the stations also worked from October 15 to November 14. For the first time, there was an opportunity to fill the census form on the portal of public services (Gosuslugi) until November 8. The term for summing up the preliminary results is April 2022. The final results of the census are projected to be published in the 4th quarter of 2022.

== Provisional results ==
Provisional results of the census have been published by Rosstat with further results announced for publication in June–December 2022.

Federal subject	Provisional population results on 1 October 2021 (thousands)			2021 compared to 2010** (total population % change)	In the total number of population, %			
Federal subject	total population	including		2021 compared to 2010** (total population % change)	2021		2010**	
Federal subject	total population	urban	rural	2021 compared to 2010** (total population % change)	urban	rural	urban	rural
(Russia) Russian Federation	147,190	110,087	37,103	101.4	74.8	25.2	73.5	26.5
Central Federal District:	40,342	33,123	7,219	105.0	82.1	17.9	81.3	18.7
Belgorod Oblast	1,540	1,005	535	100.5	65.3	34.7	66.1	33.9
Bryansk Oblast	1,169	812	357	91.5	69.5	30.5	69.1	30.9
Vladimir Oblast	1,348	1,046	302	93.4	77.6	22.4	77.6	22.4
Voronezh Oblast	2,309	1,581	728	98.9	68.5	31.5	63.7	36.3
Ivanovo Oblast	928	760	168	87.4	81.9	18.1	80.9	19.1
Kaluga Oblast	1,070	802	268	105.8	75.0	25.0	76.3	23.7
Kostroma Oblast	581	428	153	87.0	73.7	26.3	69.9	30.1
Kursk Oblast	1,082	741	341	96.0	68.5	31.5	65.2	34.8
Lipetsk Oblast	1,143	721	422	97.4	63.1	36.9	63.7	36.3
Moscow Oblast	8,532	6,698	1,834	124.4	78.5	21.5	81.3	18.7
Oryol Oblast	713	475	238	90.6	66.6	33.4	65.5	34.5
Ryazan Oblast	1,103	787	316	95.6	71.4	28.6	70.9	29.1
Smolensk Oblast	888	645	243	90.1	72.6	27.4	72.7	27.3
Tambov Oblast	983	591	392	90.0	60.1	39.9	58.7	41.3
Tver Oblast	1,230	939	291	90.9	76.3	23.7	74.7	25.3
Tula Oblast	1,501	1,101	400	96.6	73.4	26.6	79.4	20.6
Yaroslavl Oblast	1,210	981	229	95.1	81.1	18.9	82.2	17.8
Moscow	13,010	13,010	—	110.8	100	—	98.9	1.1
North Western Federal District:	13,917	11,829	2,088	102.2	85.0	15.0	83.5	16.5
Republic of Karelia	533	424	109	82.8	79.5	20.5	78.0	22.0
Komi Republic	738	572	166	81.9	77.5	22.5	77.0	23.0
Arkhangelsk Oblast	1,020	795	225	83.1	77.9	22.1	75.7	24.3
Nenets Autonomous Okrug	41	30	11	97.6	73.2	26.8	67.9	32.1
(Arkhangelsk Oblast) without the autonomous okrug	979	765	214	82.5	78.1	21.9	76.0	24.0
Vologda Oblast	1,143	828	315	95.1	72.4	27.6	70.7	29.3
Kaliningrad Oblast	1,030	791	239	109.3	76.8	23.2	77.6	22.4
Leningrad Oblast	2,001	1,346	655	116.5	67.3	32.7	65.7	34.3
Murmansk Oblast	668	622	46	84.0	93.1	6.9	92.8	7.2
Novgorod Oblast	583	426	157	92.0	73.1	26.9	70.6	29.4
Pskov Oblast	600	425	175	89.2	70.8	29.2	70.2	29.8
Saint Petersburg	5,602	5,602	—	114.8	100	—	100	—
Southern Federal District:	16,746	10,578	6,168	103.8	63.2	36.8	61.8	38.2
Republic of Adyghea	497	246	251	113.0	49.5	50.5	50.9	49.1
Republic of Kalmykia	267	125	142	92.4	46.8	53.2	44.1	55.9
Republic of Crimea	1,935	977	958	102.3	50.5	49.5	50.7	49.3
Krasnodar Krai	5,838	3,321	2,517	111.7	56.9	43.1	52.9	47.1
Astrakhan Oblast	960	618	342	95.0	64.4	35.6	66.7	33.3
Volgograd Oblast	2,501	1,936	565	95.8	77.4	22.6	76.0	24.0
Rostov Oblast	4,201	2,852	1,349	98.2	67.9	32.1	67.2	32.8
Sevastopol	548	506	42	139.4	92.3	7.7	92.3	7.7
North Caucasian Federal District:	10,171	5,153	5,018	107.9	50.7	49.3	49.2	50.8
Republic of Dagestan	3,182	1,439	1,743	109.3	45.2	54.8	45.2	54.8
Republic of Ingushetia	510	279	231	123.5	54.7	45.3	38.3	61.7
Republic of Kabardino-Balkaria	904	469	435	105.1	51.9	48.1	54.5	45.5
Karachay-Cherkess Republic	470	194	276	98.3	41.3	58.7	43.4	56.6
Republic of North Ossetia	687	434	253	96.4	63.2	36.8	63.7	36.3
Chechen Republic	1,511	577	934	119.1	38.2	61.8	34.9	65.1
Stavropol Krai	2,908	1,761	1,147	104.4	60.6	39.4	57.2	42.8
Volga Federal District:	28,943	20,877	8,066	96.8	72.1	27.9	70.8	29.2
Republic of Bashkortostan	4,091	2,530	1,561	100.5	61.8	38.2	60.4	39.6
Republic of Mari El	677	463	214	97.3	68.4	31.6	63.1	36.9
Republic of Mordovia	784	496	288	93.9	63.3	36.7	60.4	39.6
Republic of Tatarstan	4,005	3,074	931	105.8	76.8	23.2	75.4	24.6
Udmurt Republic	1,453	954	499	95.5	65.7	34.3	69.2	30.8
Chuvash Republic	1,187	758	429	94.8	63.9	36.1	58.8	41.2
Perm Krai	2,532	1,915	617	96.1	75.6	24.4	75.0	25.0
Kirov Oblast	1,154	897	257	86.1	77.7	22.3	74.0	26.0
Nizhny Novgorod Oblast	3,119	2,493	626	94.2	79.9	20.1	78.9	21.1
Orenburg Oblast	1,863	1,112	751	91.6	59.7	40.3	59.7	40.3
Penza Oblast	1,266	870	396	91.3	68.7	31.3	67.1	32.9
Samara Oblast	3,173	2,526	647	98.7	79.6	20.4	80.2	19.8
Saratov Oblast	2,443	1,870	573	96.9	76.5	23.5	74.5	25.5
Ulyanovsk Oblast	1,197	918	279	92.6	76.7	23.3	73.5	26.5
Ural Federal District:	12,301	10,080	2,221	101.8	81.9	18.1	79.9	20.1
Kurgan Oblast	777	496	281	85.3	63.8	36.2	60.3	39.7
Sverdlovsk Oblast	4,269	3,661	608	99.3	85.8	14.2	83.9	16.1
Tyumen Oblast	3,824	3,088	736	112.6	80.8	19.2	78.1	21.9
Khanty-Mansi Autonomous Okrug	1,711	1,575	136	111.7	92.1	7.9	91.5	8.5
Yamalo-Nenets Autonomous Okrug	510	431	79	97.5	84.5	15.5	84.7	15.3
(Tyumen Oblast) without autonomous okrugs	1,602	1,081	521	119.5	67.5	32.5	60.3	39.7
Chelyabinsk Oblast	3,431	2,835	596	98.7	82.6	17.4	82.0	18.0
Siberian Federal District:	16,793	12,579	4,214	97.8	74.9	25.1	73.1	26.9
Altai Republic	211	65	146	102.4	30.8	69.2	27.6	72.4
Republic of Tuva	337	184	153	109.4	54.6	45.4	53.1	46.9
Republic of Khakassia	535	366	169	100.6	68.4	31.6	67.3	32.7
Altai Krai	2,164	1,258	906	89.4	58.1	41.9	54.7	45.3
Krasnoyarsk Krai	2,857	2,265	592	101.0	79.3	20.7	76.3	23.7
Irkutsk Oblast	2,370	1,839	531	97.6	77.6	22.4	79.6	20.4
Kemerovo Oblast	2,601	2,250	351	94.1	86.5	13.5	85.4	14.6
Novosibirsk Oblast	2,798	2,228	570	105.0	79.6	20.4	77.3	22.7
Omsk Oblast	1,859	1,366	493	94.0	73.5	26.5	71.5	28.5
Tomsk Oblast	1,063	758	305	101.5	71.3	28.7	70.2	29.8
Far Eastern Federal District:	7,976	5,867	2,109	95.3	73.6	26.4	71.7	28.3
Republic of Buryatia	979	579	400	100.7	59.1	40.9	58.4	41.6
Republic of Sakha	996	665	331	103.9	66.8	33.2	64.1	35.9
Zabaykalsky Krai	1,004	694	310	90.7	69.1	30.9	65.9	34.1
Kamchatka Krai	292	227	65	90.7	77.7	22.3	77.4	22.6
Primorsky Krai	1,845	1,447	398	94.3	78.4	21.6	76.1	23.9
Khabarovsk Krai	1,293	1,078	215	96.2	83.4	16.6	81.8	18.2
Amur Oblast	767	522	245	92.4	68.1	31.9	66.8	33.2
Magadan Oblast	136	131	5	86.6	96.3	3.7	95.4	4.6
Sakhalin Oblast	467	385	82	93.8	82.4	17.6	79.7	20.3
Jewish Autonomous Oblast	150	106	44	84.7	70.7	29.3	67.6	32.4
Chukotka Autonomous Okrug	47	32	15	92.2	68.1	31.9	64.8	35.2

^{**} — including the results of the federal statistical study "Population census in the Crimean Federal District" with 100% population coverage.

== Scheduled release dates for final census results ==
On May 30, 2022, Rosstat published the following schedule for the publication of the final results of the population census: The current released figures can be found on the Rosstat website.

- June 2022: population by country and by all municipalities in each region
- August 2022: beginning of publication of data in the form of tables and graphs on the Rosstat website
- September 2022: gender, age, education, ethnicity and language proficiency
- October 2022: population migration, information about indigenous peoples
- November 2022: birth rate, household composition.
- December 2022: housing conditions, labor force characteristics.

== Final results ==
The publication of the final results of the census is made on the website of Rosstat:

- September 1, 2022, volume 1 of the census results "Population size and distribution" was published on the Rosstat website;
- October 1, 2022 - Volume 2 Sex and Marriage, Volume 3 Education, Volume 4 Citizenship, Volume 8 Number and Composition of Households, and Volume 10 Labor Force;
- November 1, 2022, volume 6 of the census results "Population Migration" was published on the Rosstat website;
- December 1, 2022 - Volume 7 - Livelihoods, Volume 9 - Fertility;
- December 30, 2022 - Volume 5 - "National (ethnic group) Composition and Language Proficiency", Volume 11 - "Housing Conditions of the Population".

=== Volume 1 "Number and distribution of the population" ===
- Table 1. Population counted in the 2020 Russian Population Census
- Table 2. Population change in Russia
- Table 3. Number of municipalities, intracity districts, city districts, inter-settlement territories and settlements by constituent entities of the Russian Federation
- Table 4. The number of urban and rural population by sex in the constituent entities of the Russian Federation
- Table 5. Population of Russia, federal districts, constituent entities of the Russian Federation, urban districts, municipal districts, municipal districts, urban and rural settlements, urban settlements, rural settlements with a population of 3,000 people or more
- Table 6. Grouping of urban districts by population by constituent entities of the Russian Federation
- Table 7. Grouping of municipal districts and municipal districts by population in the constituent entities of the Russian Federation
- Table 8. Grouping of urban settlements of municipal districts by population in the constituent entities of the Russian Federation
- Table 9. Grouping of rural settlements of municipal districts by population in the constituent entities of the Russian Federation
- Table 10. Grouping of urban settlements by population by constituent entities of the Russian Federation
- Table 11. Grouping of rural settlements by population in the constituent entities of the Russian Federation.

=== Volume 2 "Age-sex composition and marital status" ===
- Table 1. Population by age and sex
- Table 2. Population by age groups and gender by constituent entities of the Russian Federation
- Table 3. Population by main age groups by constituent entities of the Russian Federation
- Table 4. Demographic burden on the working-age population by constituent entities of the Russian Federation
- Table 5. Population by age, sex and marital status by constituent entities of the Russian Federation.

=== Volume 3 "Education" ===
- Table 1. Population by age, gender and level of education by constituent entities of the Russian Federation
- Table 2 Degree-holding population by age group and sex
- Table 3. Population with academic degrees, by age group and gender, by constituent entity of the Russian Federation
- Table 4. Employed population of private households by age groups, gender and level of education in the constituent entities of the Russian Federation
- Table 5. Population enrolled in basic and additional educational programs, gender and age by constituent entities of the Russian Federation.

=== Volume 4 "Citizenship" ===
- Table 1. Population by citizenship and age groups
- Table 2. Population by citizenship and age groups by subjects of the Russian Federation
- Table 3. Population by citizenship and place of birth
- Table 4. Population by citizenship and place of birth by subjects of the Russian Federation

=== Volume 5 "National (ethnic group) composition and language proficiency" ===
- Table 1. National (ethnic) composition of the population
- Table 2. Composition of the population group "Those who indicated other answers about national (ethnic) affiliation"
- Table 3. Population by nationality (ethnic groups), knowledge of the Russian language and its use
- Table 4. Language proficiency and use of languages by the population
- Table 5. Language skills of the population of the most numerous nationalities (ethnic groups)
- Table 6. Population by mother tongue
- Table 7. Population of the most numerous nationalities (ethnic groups) by native language
- Table 8. Population of the most numerous nationalities (ethnic groups) by age group and sex
- Table 9. Population of the most numerous nationalities (ethnic groups) by age group, sex and marital status
- Table 10. Population of the most numerous nationalities (ethnic groups) by age group, sex and level of education
- Table 11. Population of the most numerous nationalities (ethnic groups) by age groups, sex and sources of livelihood
- Table 12. Language proficiency of the population of different age groups
- Table 13. Private households of two or more persons by national homogeneity and household size
- Table 14. Women of the most numerous nationalities by nationality, age group and number of children born
- Table 15. Women of the most numerous nationalities by nationality, level of education and number of children born
- Table 16. Women of the most numerous nationalities by age at which they gave birth to their first child
- Table 17. Population of indigenous peoples of the Russian Federation
- Table 18. Knowledge of the languages of the indigenous peoples of the Russian Federation
- Table 19. Use of languages by the indigenous peoples of the Russian Federation
- Table 20. Population of indigenous peoples of the Russian Federation by mother tongue

=== Volume 6 "Population Migration" ===
- Table 1. Population by place of birth and place of residence on the territory of the Russian Federation by constituent entities of the Russian Federation
- Table 2. Population of private households by duration of residence in the place of permanent residence, sex, age groups by constituent entities of the Russian Federation
- Table 3. Population of private households by place of permanent residence and residence for more than one year in other countries by constituent entities of the Russian Federation
- Table 4. Population of private households by residence for more than one year in other countries and year of arrival in the territory of the Russian Federation
- Table 5. Population of private households by place of residence, age groups and place of registration by constituent entities of the Russian Federation
- Table 6. Employed population of private households aged 15 years and over by place of residence and place of registration in the constituent entities of the Russian Federation
- Table 7. Population temporarily staying on the territory of the Russian Federation, by country of permanent residence and purpose of coming to Russia
- Table 8. Population temporarily staying on the territory of the Russian Federation, by country of permanent residence and purpose of coming to Russia by constituent entities of the Russian Federation
- Table 9. Population temporarily staying on the territory of the Russian Federation, by country of permanent residence and age groups
- Table 10. Population temporarily staying on the territory of the Russian Federation, by country of permanent residence and age groups by constituent entities of the Russian Federation
- Table 11. Population temporarily staying on the territory of the Russian Federation for the purpose of work, study or private travel, by country of permanent residence and citizenship

=== Volume 7 "Sources of Livelihood" ===
- Table 1. Population by age groups, sex and sources of livelihood
- Table 2. Population by age groups, gender and sources of livelihood by constituent entities of the Russian Federation
- Table 3. Population by Main Source of Livelihood, Age Group and Sex
- Table 4. Population by Main Source of Livelihood, Age Groups and Gender by Constituent Entities of the Russian Federation

=== Volume 8 "Number and composition of households" ===
- Table 1. Population of private and collective households, homeless households by constituent entities of the Russian Federation.
- Table 2. Private households by household size by constituent entities of the Russian Federation.
- Table 3. Private households of two or more persons by type, household size and number of children under 18.
- Table 4. Private households consisting of two or more people, by types, household size and number of children under 18 years of age in the constituent entities of the Russian Federation.
- Table 5. Private households of two or more persons, by number of employees aged 15 years and over and number of dependents.
- Table 6. Private households consisting of two or more people, by the number of employees aged 15 years and over and the number of dependents by constituent entities of the Russian Federation.
- Table 7. Population of private one-person households by main source of livelihood and age groups.
- Table 8. Population of private households consisting of one person, by main source of livelihood and age groups by constituent entities of the Russian Federation.
- Table 9. Family units in private households by size and number of children under 18.
- Table 10. Family cells that are part of private households, by size and number of children under 18 years of age in the constituent entities of the Russian Federation.
- Table 11. Family cells in private households with adults under 35 by size and number of children under 18.
- Table 12. Family cells that are part of private households with adults under 35 years of age, by size and number of children under 18 years of age, by constituent entity of the Russian Federation.
- Table 13. Family cells that are part of private households, by age groups of children.
- Table 14. Population of collective and homeless households by sex and age groups.

=== Volume 9 Fertility ===
- Table 1. Women living in private households, by age groups and number of children born in the constituent entities of the Russian Federation.
- Table 2. Employed women living in private households, by age groups and the number of children born in the constituent entities of the Russian Federation.
- Table 3. Married women living in private households, by age groups and number of children born in the constituent entities of the Russian Federation.
- Table 4. Women living in private households, by age groups and age at which they gave birth to their first child, by constituent entities of the Russian Federation.
- Table 5. Average number of children born to women living in private households with different levels of education, by constituent entities of the Russian Federation (per 1,000 women of the corresponding age and level of education who indicated the number of children born).

=== Volume 10 "Workforce" ===
- Table 1. Population of private households by age group, sex and labor force participation status.
- Table 2. Population of private households by age groups, gender and labor force participation status by constituent entities of the Russian Federation.
- Table 3. Population of Private Households by Gender, Labor Force Status and Level of Education.
- Table 4. Population of Private Households by Labor Force Participation Status and Level of Education by Constituent Entities of the Russian Federation.
- Table 5. Potential labor force for reasons of non-participation in the labor force.
- Table 6. Potential labor force for reasons of non-participation in the labor force by constituent entities of the Russian Federation.
- Table 7. Employed population of private households by sex, age groups and employment status.
- Table 8. Employed population of private households by age groups and employment status by constituent entities of the Russian Federation.
- Table 9. Employed population of private households by territory of location of work and employment status.
- Table 10. Employed population of private households by territory of location of work and employment status by constituent entities of the Russian Federation.
- Table 11. Employed population of private households working outside their settlement, by territory of location of work and frequency of travel to work.
- Table 12. Employed population of private households working outside their settlement, by territory of location of work and frequency of travel to work by constituent entities of the Russian Federation.

=== Volume 11 "Housing conditions of the population" ===
- Table 1. Population by types of residential premises occupied by constituent entities of the Russian Federation
- Table 2. Private households by types of residential premises occupied and household size by constituent entities of the Russian Federation
- Table 3. Private households living in individual houses, separate and communal apartments, by number of rooms occupied and household size
- Table 4. Population of private households living in individual houses, separate and communal apartments, by the time the house was built and the material of the outer walls
- Table 5. Provision of private households living in individual houses, separate and communal apartments, with various types of improvement
- Table 6. Dwellings by type, number of rooms and number of private households living in them
- Table 7. Private households by types of residential premises occupied and the size of the total area of an individual house, apartment

== Ethnic groups of Russia in the 2021 Census ==
Categories			Year		
Ethnic group	Language family	Main area	2021 Census		
Ethnic group	Language family	Main area	Number	% of total population	% of those who declared ethnicity
Russians	Slavic	European Russia	105,620,179	71.76%	80.85%
Tatars	Turkic	European Russia	4,713,669	3.2%	3.61%
Chechens	Northeast Caucasian	Caucasus	1,674,854	1.14%	1.28%
Bashkir	Turkic	European Russia	1,571,879	1.07%	1.2%
Chuvashs	Turkic	European Russia	1,067,139	0.73%	0.82%
Avars	Northeast Caucasian	Caucasus	1,012,074	0.69%	0.78%
Armenians	Indo-European	Caucasus	946,172	0.64%	0.72%
Ukrainians	Slavic	European Russia	884,007	0.6%	0.68%
Dargins	Northeast Caucasian	Caucasus	626,601	0.43%	0.48%
Kazakhs	Turkic	Southern	591,970	0.4%	0.45%
Kumyks	Turkic	Caucasus	565,830	0.38%	0.43%
Kabardins	Northwest Caucasian	Caucasus	523,404	0.36%	0.4%
Ingush	Northeast Caucasian	Caucasus	517,186	0.35%	0.4%
Lezgins	Northeast Caucasian	Caucasus	488,608	0.33%	0.37%
Ossetians	Iranian	Caucasus	485,646	0.33%	0.37%
Mordvins	Uralic	European Russia	484,450	0.33%	0.37%
Yakuts (incl. Dolgans 1939–1959)	Turkic	Far East	478,409	0.33%	0.37%
Azerbaijanis	Turkic	Caucasus	474,576	0.32%	0.36%
Buryats (incl. Soyots 1939–1989)	Mongolic	Siberia	460,053	0.31%	0.35%
Mari	Uralic	European Russia	423,803	0.29%	0.32%
Udmurts (incl. Besermyan 1939–1989)	Uralic	European Russia	386,465	0.26%	0.3%
Tajiks	Iranian	Saint Petersburg	350,236	0.24%	0.27%
Uzbeks	Turkic	Moscow	323,278	0.22%	0.25%
Tuvans	Turkic	Siberia	295,384	0.2%	0.23%
Crimean Tatars	Turkic	European Russia	257,592	0.18%	0.2%
Karachays	Turkic	Caucasus	226,271	0.15%	0.17%
Belarusians	Slavic	European Russia	208,046	0.14%	0.16%
Germans	Germanic	European Russia	195,256	0.13%	0.15%
Kalmyks	Mongolic	Caucasus	179,547	0.12%	0.14%
Laks	Northeast Caucasian	Caucasus	173,416	0.12%	0.13%
Roma	Indo-Aryan	European Russia	173,400	0.12%	0.13%
Tabasarans	Northeast Caucasian	Caucasus	151,466	0.1%	0.12%
Komi (incl. Komi-Permyak 1939)	Uralic	European Russia	148,516	0.1%	0.11%
Kyrgyz	Turkic	Moscow	137,780	0.09%	0.11%
Balkars	Turkic	Caucasus	125,044	0.08%	0.1%
Turks (incl. Meskhetian Turks 1926–1989)	Turkic	Caucasus	116,705	0.08%	0.09%
Cherkess / Circassians (in Adyghe 1926–1939)	Northwest Caucasian	Caucasus	114,697	0.08%	0.09%
Georgians	South Caucasian	Caucasus	112,765	0.08%	0.09%
Adyghe (incl. Shapsugs 1926–1989 and Cherkess 1926–1939)	Northwest Caucasian	Caucasus	111,471	0.08%	0.09%
Nogais	Turkic	Caucasus	109,042	0.07%	0.08%
Koreans	Koreanic	Far East	87,819	0.06%	0.07%
Altay	Turkic	Siberia	83,125	0.06%	0.06%
Ashkenazi Jews	Semitic	European Russia	82,644	0.06%	0.06%
Moldovans	Romance	European Russia	77,509	0.05%	0.06%
Khakas	Turkic	Siberia	61,365	0.04%	0.05%
Komi-Permyak (in Komi 1939)	Uralic	European Russia	55,786	0.04%	0.04%
Pontic Greeks (including Caucasus Greeks)	Hellenic	Caucasus	53,972	0.04%	0.04%
Nenets (incl. Enets 1926–1979 and Nganasans 1926–1939)	Uralic	Siberia	49,646	0.03%	0.04%
Abazas	Northwest Caucasian	Caucasus	41,793	0.03%	0.03%
Turkmens	Turkic	Caucasus	41,328	0.03%	0.03%
Evenks	Tungusic	Far East	39,226	0.03%	0.03%
Aghuls	Northeast Caucasian	Caucasus	34,576	0.02%	0.03%
Rutuls	Northeast Caucasian	Caucasus	34,259	0.02%	0.03%
Karelians	Uralic	European Russia	32,422	0.02%	0.02%
Khanty	Uralic	Urals	31,467	0.02%	0.02%
Yazidis	Iranian	Caucasus	26,257	0.02%	0.02%
Kurds (incl. Yazidis 1939–1989)	Iranian	Caucasus	24,657	0.01%	0.02%
Poles	Slavic	European Russia	22,024	0.01%	0.02%
Evens	Tungusic	Far East	19,913	0.01%	0.02%
Chinese	Sino-Tibetan	Far East	19,644	0.01%	0.02%
Arabs	Semitic	Caucasus	16,329	0.01%	0.01%
Chukchi (incl. Kereks 1926–1989 and Chuvans 1939–1979)	Chukotko-Kamchatkan	Far East	16,200	0.01%	0.01%
Lithuanians	Baltic	European Russia	13,230	0.01%	0.01%
Tsakhurs	Northeast Caucasian	Caucasus	12,541	0.01%	0.01%
Mansi	Uralic	Urals	12,228	0.01%	0.01%
Bulgarians	Slavic	European Russia	11,851	0.01%	0.01%
Nanais	Tungusic	Far East	11,623	0.01%	0.01%
Shors	Turkic	Siberia	10,507	0.01%	0.01%
Gagauz	Turkic	European Russia	9,272	0.01%	0.01%
Latvians	Baltic	European Russia	8,516	0.01%	0.01%
Abkhaz	Northwest Caucasian	Caucasus	8,177	0.01%	0.01%
Dolgans (in Yakuts 1939–1959)	Turkic	Siberia	8,157	0.01%	0.01%
Finns	Uralic	European Russia	7,978	0.01%	0.01%
Vietnamese	Austro-Asiatic	Moscow	7,859	0.01%	0.01%
Estonians	Uralic	European Russia	7,778	0.01%	0.01%
Indians	Indo-Aryan	European Russia	7,667	0.01%	0.01%
Koryaks	Chukotko-Kamchatkan	Far East	7,485	0.01%	0.01%
Nağaybäk	Turkic	Urals	5,719	0.00%	0.00%
Veps	Uralic	Northwest	4,534	0.00%	0.00%
Assyrians	Semitic	Caucasus	4,421	0.00%	0.00%
Soyots (in Buryats 1939–1989)	Mongolic	Siberia	4,368	0.00%	0.00%
Meskhetian Turks (in Turks 1926–1989)	Turkic	Caucasus	4,095	0.00%	0.00%
Nivkh	Nivkh	Far East	3,842	0.00%	0.00%
Talysh	Iranian	Caucasus	3,595	0.00%	0.00%
Afghans	Iranian	Moscow	3,536	0.00%	0.00%
Selkups	Uralic	Siberia	3,458	0.00%	0.00%
Dungans	Sino-Tibetan	Siberia	3,028	0.00%	0.00%
Itelmeni	Chukotko-Kamchatkan	Far East	2,596	0.00%	0.00%
Udis	Northeast Caucasian	Caucasus	2,551	0.00%	0.00%
Ulchs	Tungusic	Far East	2,472	0.00%	0.00%
Persians	Iranian	Caucasus	2,434	0.00%	0.00%
Kumandins	Turkic	Siberia	2,408	0.00%	0.00%
Teleuts	Turkic	Siberia	2,217	0.00%	0.00%
Uygurs	Turkic	Siberia	2,217	0.00%	0.00%
Serbs	Slavic	European Russia	2,151	0.00%	0.00%
Hemshins	Indo-European	Caucasus	2,082	0.00%	0.00%
Besermyan (in Udmurts 1939–1989)	Uralic	European Russia	2,036	0.00%	0.00%
Shapsugs (in Adyghe 1926–1989)	Northwest Caucasian	Caucasus	1,914	0.00%	0.00%
Romanians	Romance	European Russia	1,850	0.00%	0.00%
Yukaghir	Yukaghir	Far East	1,802	0.00%	0.00%
Inuit /Yupik	Inuit–Yupik–Unangan	Far East	1,657	0.00%	0.00%
Kamchadals	Chukotko-Kamchatkan	Far East	1,547	0.00%	0.00%
Sami	Uralic	European Russia	1,530	0.00%	0.00%
Hungarians	Uralic	European Russia	1,460	0.00%	0.00%
Italians	Romance	European Russia	1,460	0.00%	0.00%
French	Romance	European Russia	1,457	0.00%	0.00%
Udege (incl. Taz 1926–1989)	Tungusic	Far East	1,325	0.00%	0.00%
Mongols	Mongolic	Siberia	1,318	0.00%	0.00%
Czechs	Slavic	European Russia	1,214	0.00%	0.00%
Spanish	Romance	European Russia	1,175	0.00%	0.00%
British	Germanic	European Russia	1,167	0.00%	0.00%
Americans	Germanic	European Russia	1,129	0.00%	0.00%
Ket	Yeniseian	Siberia	1,088	0.00%	0.00%
Krymchaks	Turkic	European Russia	954	0.00%	0.00%
Chuvans (in Chukchi 1939–1979)	Chukotko-Kamchatkan	Far East	900	0.00%	0.00%
Karakalpaks	Turkic	Volga	838	0.00%	0.00%
Izhorians	Uralic	European Russia	781	0.00%	0.00%
Tofalar	Turkic	Siberia	719	0.00%	0.00%
Cubans	Romance	European Russia	701	0.00%	0.00%
Nganasans (in Nenets 1926–1939)	Uralic	Siberia	687	0.00%	0.00%
Japanese	Japonic	Far East	663	0.00%	0.00%
Rusyns	Slavic	European Russia	596	0.00%	0.00%
Tats	Iranian	Caucasus	575	0.00%	0.00%
Orochs (incl. Oroks 1970–1979)	Tungusic	Far East	527	0.00%	0.00%
Karaites	Turkic	European Russia	500	0.00%	0.00%
Negidals	Tungusic	Far East	481	0.00%	0.00%
Pamiris	Iranian	European Russia	467	0.00%	0.00%
Pakistani	Indo-Aryan	European Russia	410	0.00%	0.00%
Aleut	Inuit–Yupik–Unangan	Far East	397	0.00%	0.00%
Chulyms	Turkic	Siberia	382	0.00%	0.00%
Oroks (in Orochs 1970–1979)	Tungusic	Far East	268	0.00%	0.00%
Mountain Jews	Semitic	Caucasus	266	0.00%	0.00%
Taz (in Udege 1926–1989)	Sino-Tibetan	Far East	235	0.00%	0.00%
Enets (in Nenets 1926–1979)	Uralic	Siberia	201	0.00%	0.00%
Slovaks	Slavic	European Russia	193	0.00%	0.00%
Croats	Slavic	European Russia	177	0.00%	0.00%
Macedonians	Slavic	European Russia	155	0.00%	0.00%
Slovenes	Slavic	European Russia	108	0.00%	0.00%
Votes	Uralic	European Russia	99	0.00%	0.00%
Bosnians	Slavic	European Russia	98	0.00%	0.00%
Montenegrins	Slavic	European Russia	85	0.00%	0.00%
Kereks (in Chukchi 1926–1989)	Chukotko-Kamchatkan	Far East	23	0.00%	0.00%
Central Asian Jews	Semitic, Turkic, Iranian	European Russia	18	0.00%	0.00%
Georgian Jews	South Caucasian	Caucasus	14	0.00%	0.00%
Central Asian Rroma	Indo-Aryan	European Russia	12	0.00%	0.00%
Small Dagestan Peoples (SDP)		Caucasus			
Small Siberian Peoples (SSP)		Siberia			
Other Ethnicity		Russia	1,393,685	0.95%	1.07%
Ethnicity not stated or stated No ethnicity		Russia	17,136,960	11.64%	

== See also ==
- Demographics of Russia
