= 2002 Russian census =

Censuses in Russia

- 9–16 October 2002
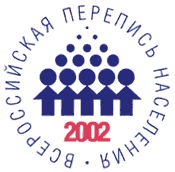
- Logo

General information
- Country: Russia
- Authority: Rosstat

Results
- Total population: 145,166,731

The 2002 Russian census (Russian: Всеросси́йская пе́репись населе́ния 2002 го́да) was the first census of the Russian Federation since the dissolution of the Soviet Union, carried out on October 9 through October 16, 2002. It was carried out by the Russian Federal Service of State Statistics (Rosstat).

== Data collection ==
The census data were collected as of midnight October 9, 2002.

=== Resident population ===
The census was primarily intended to collect statistical information about the resident population of the Russian Federation. The resident population included:

- Russian citizens living in Russia (including those temporarily away from the country, provided the absence from the country was expected to last less than one year);
- non-citizens (i.e. foreign citizens and stateless persons) who were any of the following:
  - legal permanent residents;
  - persons who have arrived in the country with the intent to settle permanently or to seek asylum, regardless of whether they have actually obtained the appropriate immigration status;
  - authorized foreign workers or students, provided the period of temporary residence in Russia was expected to last at least one year.

All detailed census tables are for the resident population.

All (resident) participants were asked questions on their gender, birth date, marital status, household composition, birthplace, citizenship, ethnic or tribal self-identification (национальность), education level, language competence, sources of income, and employment status. A sample of the participants was also asked more detailed questions about their economic and housing situation.

=== Non-residents ===
The census also counted two more groups of people:

- Russian citizens currently living abroad for more than one year in connection with employment with the federal government.
- Persons (regardless of their citizenship) permanently residing abroad but temporarily present in Russia (as tourists, short-term foreign workers, or students, etc.).

Foreign citizens present in Russia as employees of foreign diplomatic missions or international organizations and members of their household were excluded from the census altogether.

== Census results ==
The Census recorded a resident population of 145,166,731 persons, including 67,605,133 men and 77,561,598 women. That included an urban population of 106,429,000 (73%) and a rural population of 38,738,000 (27%).

The non-resident populations included:

- Russian citizens living abroad in connection with the federal government service: 107,288 (67,058 men and 40,230 women);
- Foreign residents present in Russia on the census date: 239,018 (177,465 men and 61,553 women).

=== Citizenship ===
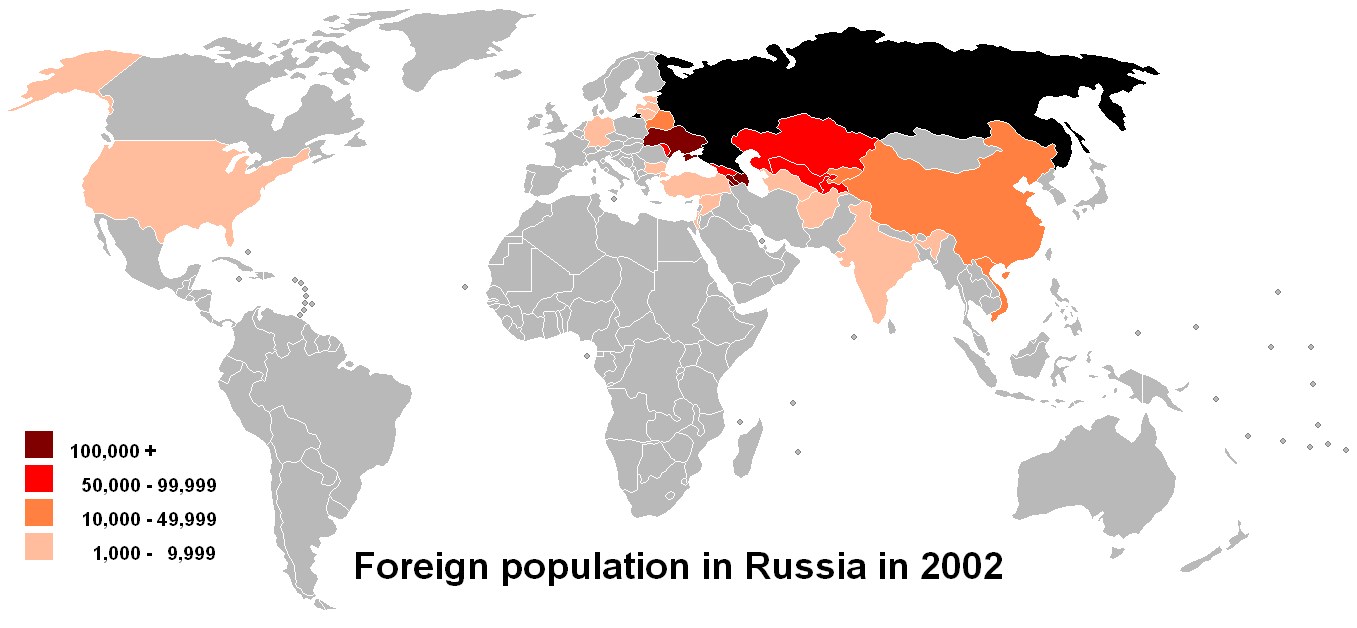

Census participants were asked what country (or countries) they were citizens of. 142,442,000 respondents reported being Russian citizens; among them, 44,000 also had citizenship of another country.

Among Russia's resident population, 1,025,413 foreign citizens and 429,881 stateless persons were counted.

	Citizens of...	
CIS countries		906,314
	Armenia	136,841
	Azerbaijan	154,911
	Belarus	40,330
	Georgia	52,918
	Kazakhstan	69,472
	Kyrgyzstan	28,843
	Moldova	50,988
	Tajikistan	64,165
	Turkmenistan	6,417
	Ukraine	230,558
	Uzbekistan	70,871
Other countries		119,099
	Afghanistan	8,221
	Bulgaria	2,262
	China	30,598
	Estonia	1,066
	Finland	285
	Germany	1,329
	Greece	612
	India	5,351
	Israel	1,016
	Latvia	2,864
	Lithuania	4,583
	Syria	1,230
	Turkey	4,991
	United States	1,361
	Vietnam	22,545
Stateless persons		429,881

1,269,023 persons did not report their citizenship.

=== Language abilities ===
Among the questions asked was, "Are you competent in the Russian language?" (Владеете ли Вы русским языком?) and "What other languages are you competent in?" (Какими иными языками Вы владеете?). As the census manual explained, "competence" (владение) meant either the ability to speak, read and write a language, or only the ability to speak it. The questions did not distinguish native and non-native speakers, nor did they try to measure the degree of language competence. For small children, presumably, the recorded answer was based on the language(s) spoken by the parents.

142.6 million (98.3%) of the responders claimed competence in Russian. Other widely reported languages (more than 500,000 speakers each) are listed in the table below.

Language	Speakers (millions)
English	6.95
(Volga) Tatar	5.35
German	2.90
Ukrainian	1.81
Chechen	1.33
Chuvash	1.33
Armenian	0.91
Avar	0.78
French	0.71
Azerbaijani	0.67
Mordvin (Moksha or Erzya)	0.61
Kabardian or Circassian	0.59
Kazakh	0.56
Dargin	0.50

1.42 million responders did not provide language information.

For a more detailed list, see List of languages of Russia.

== See also ==
- Demographics of Russia (includes ethnic composition and some other census results)
- Russian Empire census
- Soviet census
- Medal "For Merit in Conducting the All-Russian Population Census"
