= Ogdo Aksyonova =

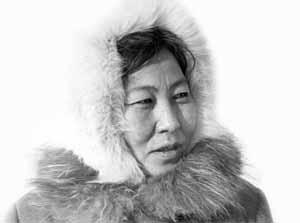
Ogdo Yegorovna Aksyonova

Ogdo (Yevdokiya) Yegorovna Aksyonova (Russian: Огдо (Евдокия) Егоровна Аксёнова; Dolgan: Огдуо Аксёнова, romanized: Ogduo Aksyonova; 8 February 1936 in Boganida, Taymyr Autonomous Okrug, USSR – 14 February 1995 in Dudinka, Russia) was a Dolgan poet, the founder of Dolgan written literature.

== Biography ==
Aksyonova was born into a family of reindeer herders and began writing poems in high school. In 1956 she was given the "Soviet Taimyr" award for her story, "Paul Chuprin". She became a cultural worker, and in 1967 was awarded a "Badge of Honor." She published works in Valery Kravets ("The Polar Truth") and in the popular magazine "Worker".

Later she printed poems and tales in the Dolgan language. Yakut printers promised to find the right fonts, which would take into account the specifics of the Dolgan language. She published a book in 1973, called "Baraksan." In her second book, Aksenova wanted to build on the song material she had. She called it "Songs of Dolgan".

In 1977 she entered into a course at the Maxim-Gorky Literature Institute in Moscow. A little earlier she had met the Moscow writer Leonid Yakhnin who undertook the task of translating her poems and stories for children. With extraordinary energy, Valentin Berestov worked on getting the material that came from the duo published by the capital's publisher "Малыш" ("The Kid"). The result was the publication of the children's book "Cloudberry".

In her higher literature courses, Aksyonova seriously addressed the issues in the Dolgan script. In her first letter to the translator Valery Kravtsov in March 1978, she commented on how she wanted to take other nations' experiences into account. "Now familiarise yourselves with our alphabet," she wrote. "I'll take five Yakut letters and two Kazakh letters." By the end of 1978, Aksyonova had prepared the first draft of its script. Her version was largely supported by Novosibirsk's philologists, and in 1979, the Dolgan alphabet was approved.

A year later, the authorities let Aksyonova organise a school in Dudinka for experimental learning at first-grade level, using her handwritten ABC. In 1983 Krasnoyarsk printers published the fourth edition of Aksyonova's manuscript on Rotaprint which was used in six schools in the Taimyr region. However, the head of the Office of Education did not immediately support Aksyonova's aims and claimed it was enough for the people of Dolgan to only know Russian. It was only in 1990 that the publishing house "Enlightenment" released the seventh version of Aksyonova's Dolgan ABC. It was this seventh version that finally received official recognition from the authorities.

During the 1980s, Aksyonova was also involved in compiling a dictionary of the Dolgan language for an elementary school, containing 4,000 words, and a reconciliation of Tomsk scientists' material to make an academic dictionary containing 20,000 words. Ogdo Aksyonova also worked as a senior editor at the national department of her district's radio. Near the end of her life, Aksyonova decided to go back to old Dolgan ritual poetry.

Ogdo Aksyonova died on the night of 14 February 1995.
