= Vladimir Gusev =

Vladimir Gusev may refer to:

- Vladimir Gusev (cyclist) (born 1982), Russian road racing cyclist
- Vladimir Gusev (ice hockey) (born 1982), Russian ice hockey player
- Vladimir Gusev (politician) (born 1932), Soviet and Russian politician
- Vladimir Gusev (runner) (born 1961), Kazakhstani long-distance runner and participant at the 1997 IAAF World Half Marathon Championships
