= Sergei Shuvalov =

Russian politician (1951–2021)

- Сергей Алексеевич Шувалов
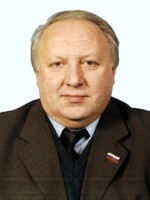

Member of the Federation Council of the Federal Assembly of the Russian Federation — representative from the executive power of Saratov Oblast
- In office 27 April 2005 – 28 April 2010
- Preceded by: Ramazan Abdulatipov
- Succeeded by: Vladimir Gusev

Chairman of the Saratov Oblast Duma
- In office 16 September 2002 – 12 April 2005
- Preceded by: Vladimir Churikov
- Succeeded by: Pavel Bolshedanov

Personal details
- Born: 24 June 1951 Saratov, Russian SFSR, Soviet Union
- Died: 25 September 2021 (aged 70) Saratov, Russia
- Party: Communist Party of the Soviet Union
- Education: Saratov Polytechnic Institute
- Awards: Medal of the Order "For Merit to the Fatherland" Second Class; Medal "For Merit in Conducting the All-Russian Population Census"

Sergei Alekseyevich Shuvalov (Russian: Сергей Алексеевич Шувалов; 24 June 1951 – 25 September 2021) was a Russian politician.

He served as chairman of the Saratov Oblast Duma from 2002 to 2005, and as the Member of the Federation Council of the Federal Assembly of the Russian Federation as the representative from the executive power of Saratov Oblast between 2005 and 2010.

== Early life and education ==
Shuvalov was born on 24 June 1951, in Saratov, then part of the Russian Soviet Federative Socialist Republic, in the Soviet Union. He studied at the Saratov Polytechnic Institute, graduating in 1973 and becoming a junior researcher in the institute's electronics department. He eventually attained the degree of Doctor of Economic Sciences and was a professor.

== Soviet politics and business career ==
Shuvalov began working as an instructor, and then deputy departmental head, of the Komsomol's Saratov regional committee in 1976, and then as an instructor in the organizational department in the party organs of the Communist Party of the Soviet Union's Volga District Committee and then the Saratov City Committee from 1979 until 1988. That year, he entered state administrative work, and in 1991 became deputy chairman of the State Property Management Committee of Saratov Oblast. Between 1992 and 1996, he was head of a number of commercial enterprises, from 1992 until 1996 as director of the company Shag-R, and then as director of the Shar-S company in 1997. He was appointed First Deputy Minister of Economy and Investment Policy of Saratov Oblast in July 1997. In February 1998, Shuvalov became the Oblast's Minister of Economy, Investment Policy and Interregional Relations. This was followed by his appointment in September 1998 as the Oblast's First Deputy Prime Minister, and Minister of Economy, and later its Vice Governor.

== Regional and national politics ==
Shuvalov was elected as a deputy to the Saratov Oblast Duma in September 2002, and was chairman of its third convocation from 16 September 2002 until 12 April 2005. He stepped down from his position on his appointment as the Member of the Federation Council of the Federal Assembly of the Russian Federation as the representative from the executive power of Saratov Oblast. He held this post until 13 May 2010. During his time on the council, he sat on several of its committees. He was a member of its budget committee from May 2005 to February 2008, and its housing policy and housing and communal services committee from July to October 2007, before becoming its deputy chairman. In June 2008, he reverted to being a member. In February 2008, he became deputy chairman of the budget committee. After leaving the Federation Council Shuvalov was acting Deputy Chairman of the Government of Saratov Oblast from 1 June 2010 until 13 July 2011, supervising its e-government project. He served for a time as the president of FC Sokol Saratov.

== Awards and death ==
He had received several awards over his career, including the Medal of the Order "For Merit to the Fatherland" Second Class in 1999, and the Medal "For Merit in Conducting the All-Russian Population Census" in 2002. He had also received an honorary diploma from the Federation Council. His son, Stanislav, graduated from Saratov State Medical University as a cardiologist in 1998, later serving as Saratov Oblast's Deputy Minister of Health.

Shuvalov died from complications of COVID-19 in Saratov on 25 September 2021, during the COVID-19 pandemic in Russia.
