= List of languages of Russia =

This is a list of languages used in Russia. Russian is the only official language at the national level and there are other 35 official languages, which are used in different regions of Russia. There are approximately 190 indigenous languages in Russia. The ten largest of these, which do not hold official state status outside the Russian Federation, are listed below in descending order of the number of speakers: Tatar, Chechen, Bashkir, Chuvash, Avar, Kabardian, Dargwa, Ossetian, Kumyk and Lezgin, according to the 2010 Russian census.

== Official language. ==
- Russian (137,494,893 speakers)

== Languages related to European Russia ==
=== Languages with 1,000,000 or more speakers ===
- English (7,574,303)
- Tatar (4,280,718)
- German (2,069,949)
- Chechen (1,354,705)
- Chuvash (1,042,989)
- Bashkir (1,152,404)
- Ukrainian (1,129,838)

=== Languages with 100,000 or more speakers ===
- Avar (715,297)
- Armenian (660,935)
- French (616,394)
- Kabardian (515,672)
- Dargwa (485,705)
- Azerbaijani (473,044)
- Ossetic (451,431)
- Kumyk (426,212)
- Lezgian (402,173)
- Mordovian languages (392,941)
  - Moksha
  - Erzya
- Eastern Mari (365,127)
- Udmurt (324,338)
- Ingush (305,868)
- Karachay-Balkar (305,364)
- Belarusian (173,980)
- Georgian (170,659)
- Komi-Zyrian (156,099)
- Spanish (152,147)
- Turkish (146,363)
- Lak (145,895)
- Romanian (128,197)
- Adyghe (117,489)

=== Languages with 10,000 or more speakers ===
- Moldovan (96,061)
- Polish (94,000)
- Nogai (87,119)
- Italian (83,202)
- Kalmyk (80,546)
- Tabassaran (75,079)
- Komi-Permyak (63,106)
- Karelian (52,000)
- Finnish (51,000)
- Lithuanian (49,000)
- Abaza (38,000)
- Western Mari (36,000)
- Latvian (34,000)
- Kurmanji (30,000)
- Yiddish (30,000)
- Rutul (29,000)
- Aghul (29,000)
- Estonian (26,000)
- Andi (23,000)
- Baltic Romany (20,000)
- Tsez (15,000)
- Bezhta (10,000)
- Vlax Romany (10,000)
- Livvi

=== Languages with 1,000 or more speakers ===
- Assyrian Neo-Aramaic (7,700)
- Khwarshi (3,000)
- Serbian
- Veps
- Tindi
- Karata
- Ludian
- Hunzib
- Bagvalal
- Botlikh
- Tsakhur
- Akhvakh
- Ghodoberi
- Archi
- Chamalal
- Judeo-Tat

=== Languages with fewer than 1,000 speakers ===
- Sami languages
  - Akkala Sami
  - Kildin Sami
  - Skolt Sami
  - Ter Sami
- Vod
- Ingrian
- Hinukh
- Kurdish

== Languages related to Asian Russia ==
=== Languages with 100,000 or more speakers ===
- Kazakh (563,000)
- Yakut (456,000)
- Buryat (368,000)
- Tuvin (242,000)
- Uzbek (238,000)
- Tajiki (131,000)

=== Languages with 10,000 or more speakers ===
- Altay (65,000)
- Khakas (52,000)
- Kyrgyz (46,000)
- Nenets (31,000)
- Evenki (13,800)
- Khanty (13,000)
- Shor (around 10,000)

=== Languages with 1,000 or more speakers ===
- Even (5,656)
- Mansi (2,746)
- Dolgan (1,054)
- Selkup (1,023)

=== Languages with fewer than 1,000 speakers ===
- Yupik languages
  - Naukan (Naukanski)
  - Sirenik
  - Central Siberian Yupik (Yuit)
- Yukaghir languages
  - Northern Yukaghir
  - Southern Yukaghir
- Ket
- Ainu
- Orok
- Udege
- Kerek
- Aleut (including Mednyy)
- Enets
- Alutor
- Negidal
- Tofalar (Karagas)
- Itelmen
- Yugh
- Nganasan
- Oroch
- Chulym
- Ulch
- Nivkh
- Nanai

== Other ==
- Korean (60,000)
  - Koryo-mar
- Mandarin Chinese (59,000)
- Turkmen (38,000)
- Czech
- Domari
- Lomavren
- Pontic Greek
- Bohtan Neo-Aramaic
- Tat language
- Russian sign language

== Language families ==
A total of 14 language families are native to Russia:

- Ainu
- Chukotko-Kamchatkan
- Eskimo–Aleut
- Indo-European
- Koreanic
- Mongolic
- Nivkh
- Northeast Caucasian
- Northwest Caucasian
- Tungusic
- Turkic
- Uralic
- Yeniseian
- Yukaghir
