= TyumenNIIgiprogas =

Natural gas company in Western Siberia

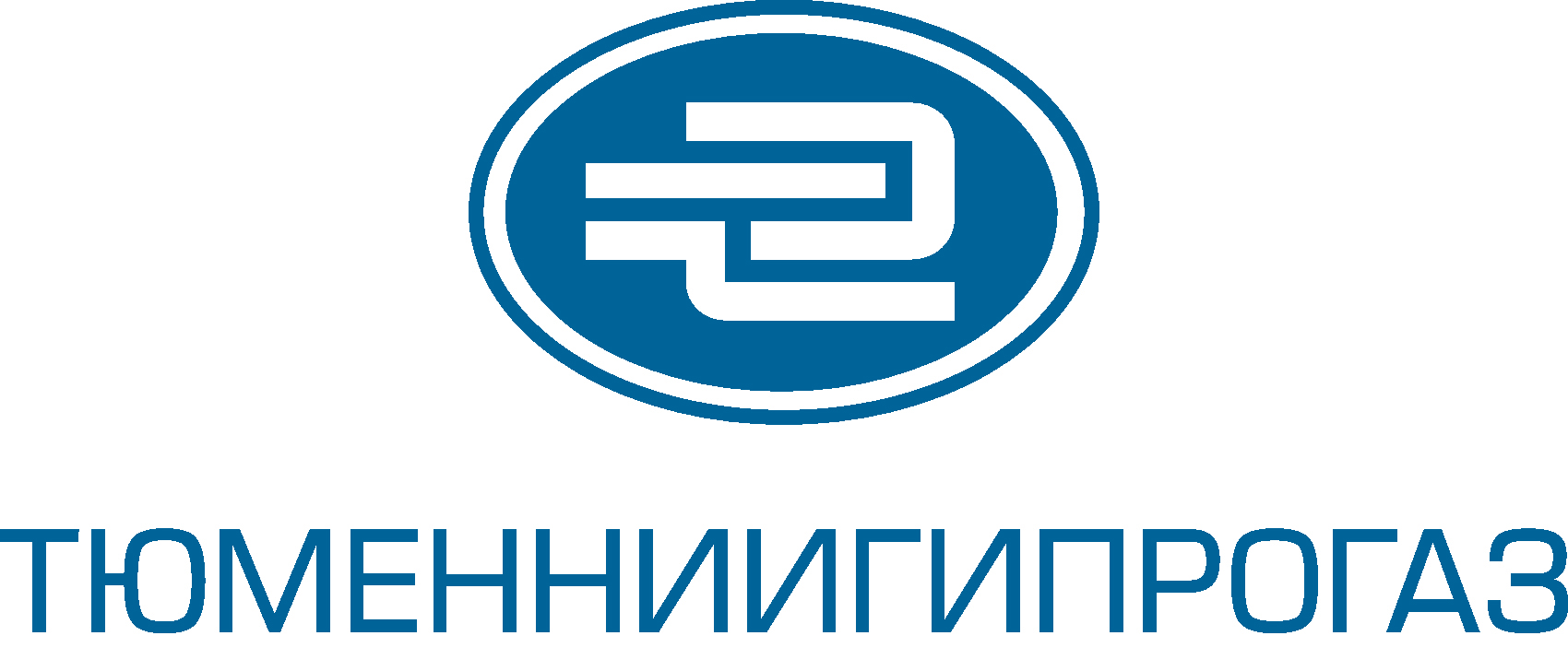

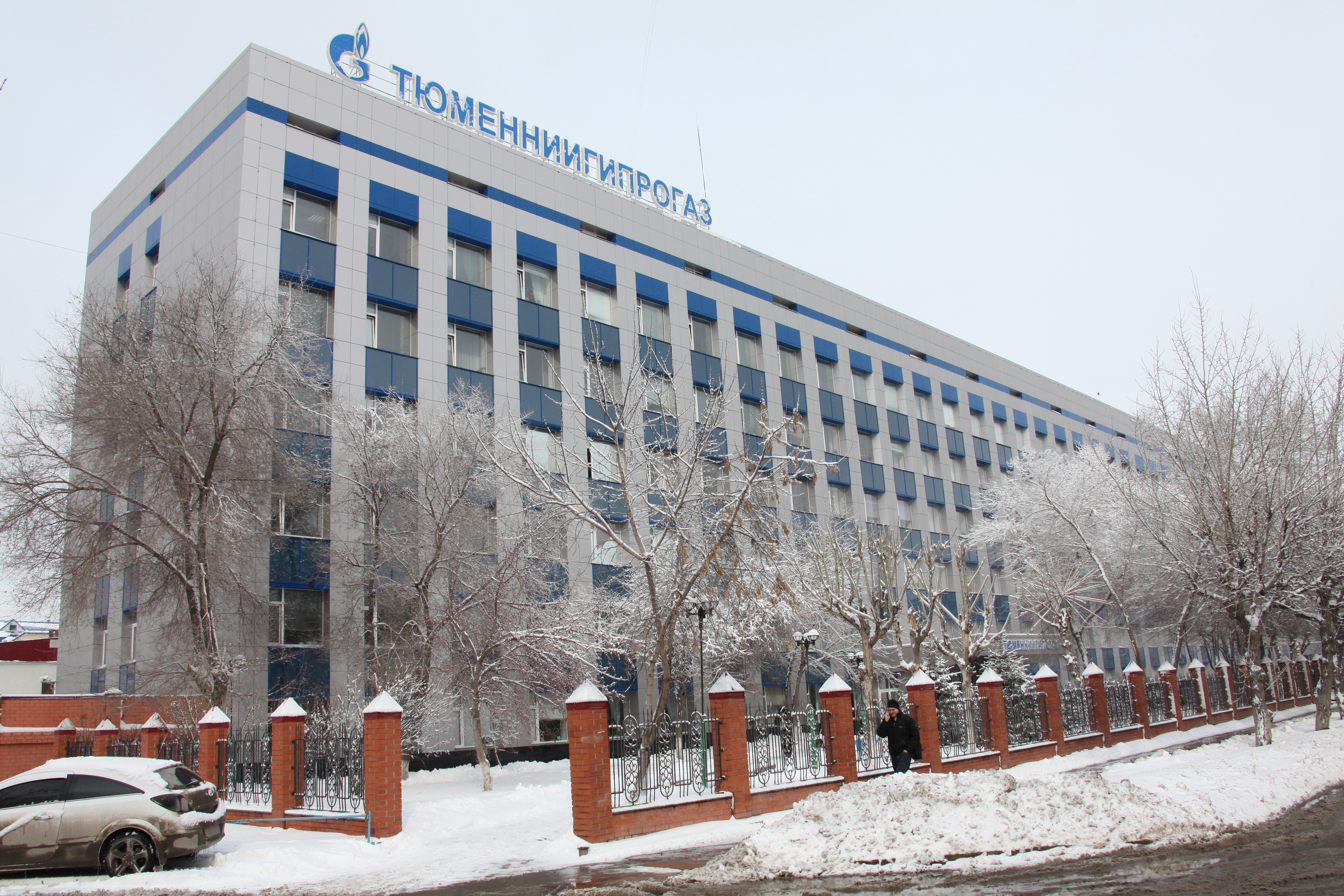
- Industry: Oil and gas industry
- Founded: 1966
- Headquarters: Tyumen, Russia
- Key people: Oleg Andreev, General Director
- Products: R&D, mechanical engineering
- Owner: Gazprom
- Website: tyumenniigiprogaz.gazprom.com

LLC TyumenNIIgiprogas is a Tyumen (Russia) based parent company of OAO "Gazprom" for designing, developing, equipping and operation of gas and gas condensate-oil fields in Western Siberia.

Research results and design solutions of TNGG engineers are being put to practice in operations in West and East Siberias, while oilfield service products of Experimental Plant are marketed all over the country. In terms of Quality Assurance System, all activities have been certified and found compliant with requirements of ISO 9001:2008 and Gazprom plc corporate standards of 9001–2012 series. The company currently employs about 1,700 workers.

== History and operations ==
The Institute as we know it today started on 3 February 1966 as Tyumen Branch of the State All-Union Research and Development Institute of Natural Gases (VNIIGAZ) by the Order No. 145 of the USSR Ministry of Gas. In May 1971 it was transformed into Siberian Research, Development and Engineering Institute of Natural Gases (SibNIPIGas) under Tyumengasprom. In January 1973 the company received its current name TyumenNIIgiprogas. That was the time when development of the giant Urengoy gas field had just started, and the field became a testing ground for many original techniques and solutions by the institute's engineers. Deviated drilling was introduced, casing collapse in permafrost challenges were addressed. In 1983 TNGG engineers designed and supervised drilling and completion of the first slanted well in permafrost zone.

The 1980s saw crystallization of an integrated approach to petroleum development combining research, design and manufacture. TyumenNIIgiprogas Institute becomes the core of Research and Production Association NPO Tyumengastechnologia with several R&D Divisions and Experimental Plant. It was cancelled in 1993. Gazprom plc board of directors by its ruling of 14 January 2002, appointed TyumenNIIgiprogas LLC Principal Authority in R&D support of gas operations in West Siberia. In 2003 development program was prepared for Yetypur and Vyngayakha fields as joint production facility. In the first unit of core handling and storage facility was launched in 2009, its design capacity is 70,000 meters of core plugs. Automatic limited manning production facility for Cenomanian gas designed by the Institute for Muravlenko Field was set off in 2011. Gas treatment plant UKPG-N designed by TyumenNIIgiprogas was brought in service in Nyda Block of Medvejie Field with Experimental Plant as process equipment supplier. In 2012, further to E&P work based on TyumenNIIgiprogas recommendations Ilbokich gas-condensate discovery came about in Krasnoyarsk Territory. The same year saw launching of Bovanenkov oil/gas/condensate field with its total fleet of production wells designed by TyumenNIIgiprogas. The projects developed by TyumenNIIgiprogas Company allowed commissioning of a start-up complex of 1A site of the Achimovsky deposits of the Urengoy gas field. It will allow recovering incremental volumes of gas and gas condensate in the fields with declining production. Field development plans of Yamburg oil and gas condensate field (Cenomanian deposits) and a Comprehensive project of the Zapolyarnoe oil and gas condensate field development are performed in 2013.

On May 13, 2015, Oleg Andreev has been appointed as General Director of LLC TyumenNIIgiprogas replacing Sergey Skrylev which became the First Deputy General Director. This change took place as a restricting of Gazprom engineering structures which resulted in establishment of LLC “Gazprom projektirovanie” under the leadership of Oleg Andreev. The first stage of restricting is appointment of Oleg as a General Director of all the companies which later will be included in LLC “Gazprom proektirovanie”.

== Water treatment ==
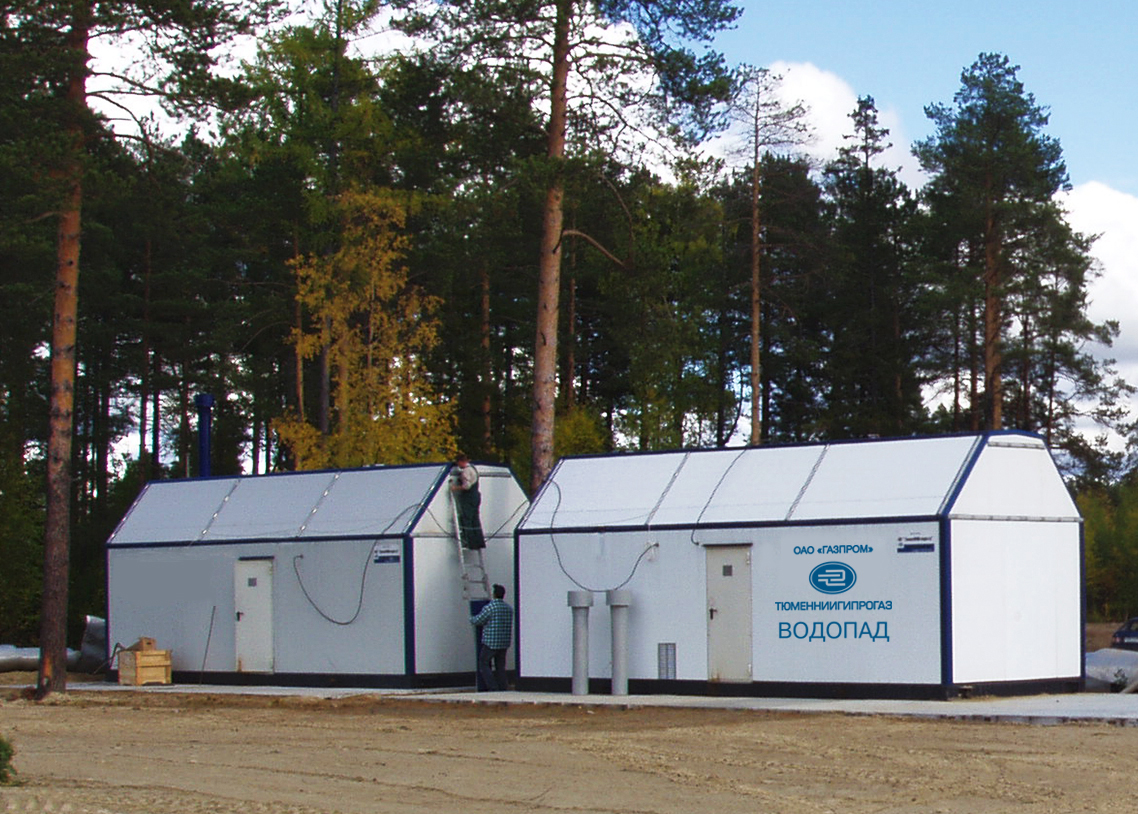
Water treatment stations Vodopad. Khanty-Mansi Autonomous Okrug

Electric coagulation method of water treatment VODOPAD has been developed and successfully applied at numerous facilities. This technology allows for conditioning of severely polluted water from various sources to potable standards. Treated water meet every requirement of Sanitary Regulations (SanPiN) # 2.1.4.1074-01 Drinking water. Resultant residue falls into the 5th hazard class (harmless), and being secondary flocculant is suitable for sewage disposal. To date more than 100 units of 5 to 8,000 cu.m/d capacity have been put into service all over Russia. Deployment of VODOPAD in Tarko-Sale (Yamalo-Nenets Autonomous Okrug, Tyumen Oblast) ensured uninterrupted potable water supply to local community. Commercially produced modular units are fully automatic, and do not require specially trained personnel.

== See also ==
- Petroleum industry in Russia
