= Vladimir Gusev (politician) =

Soviet and Russian politician (1932–2022)

- Владимир Гусев
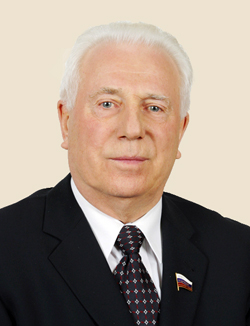
- Gusev in 2005

Senator from Saratov Oblast
- In office 28 April 2010 – 24 April 2012
- Preceded by: Sergei Shuvalov
- Succeeded by: Lyudmila Bokova

Senator from Ivanovo Oblast
- In office 25 January 2001 – 28 April 2010
- Preceded by: Vladislav Tikhomirov
- Succeeded by: Yury Yablokov

Member of the State Duma
- In office 11 January 1994 – 18 January 2000
- Parliamentary group: LDPR

Deputy Premier of the Soviet Union
- In office 20 June 1986 – 26 December 1990
- Premier: Nikolay Ryzhkov

First Deputy Premier of the RSFSR
- In office 11 April 1985 – 20 June 1986
- Premier: Vitaly Vorotnikov

Personal details
- Born: 19 April 1932 Saratov, Russian SFSR, Soviet Union
- Died: 29 August 2022 (aged 90) Saratov, Russia
- Resting place: Troyekurovskoye Cemetery
- Education: Saratov State University

Vladimir Kuzmich Gusev (Russian: Владимир Кузьмич Гусев, 19 April 1932 – 29 August 2022) was a Russian and Soviet politician.

== Biography ==
Vladimir Gusev was born on 19 April 1932, in Saratov. In 1957, he graduated from the chemical faculty of the Saratov State University as a chemist-technologist. From 1959 to 1975 he worked at the Engels chemical fiber plant, reaching the post of director. In 1975 Gusev became first secretary of the Engels city committee of the CPSU and in fact head of the city. The next year he was appointed first secretary of the Saratov regional Party committee, a position he held to 1985.

In 1985–86, Gusev was the first deputy premier of the Soviet Russia in the cabinet of Vitaly Vorotnikov. Until the end of 1990 he was deputy premier of the USSR, Chairman of the bureau for the chemical industry and forestry. In 1986, he took part in the liquidation of the consequences of the Chernobyl disaster as chairman of the state commission.

In December 1993, he was elected to the 1st State Duma by the Liberal Democratic Party list. He was the chairman of the Committee for industry, construction, transport and energy. From 2001 to 2010, Gusev represented Ivanovo Oblast in the Federation Council. From 2010 to 2012, he was senator from his home region, Saratov Oblast. Doctor of Technical Sciences.

== Awards ==
- Order "For Merit to the Fatherland" 4th class
- Order of Courage (1996)
- Order of Lenin (1971, 1982)
- Order of the October Revolution (1976)
- Order of the Badge of Honour (1965)
