= Dolgans =

Turkic ethnic group native to Russia

Total population
- 7,911

Regions with significant populations
- Russia: Krasnoyarsk Krai; Sakha: 7,885

Languages
- Dolgan, Russian

Religion
- Russian Orthodoxy, Shamanism

Related ethnic groups
- Yakuts and Evenks

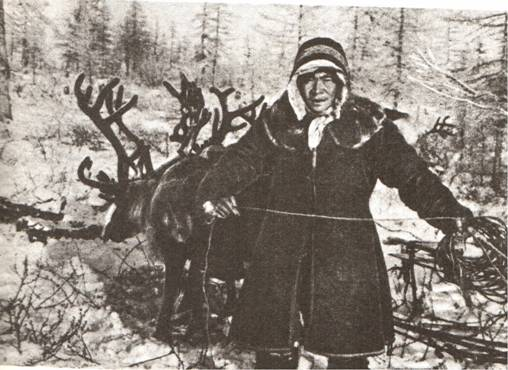
A Dolgan man

Dolgans (Russian: Долганы; Dolgan: долган, дулҕан, Һака, romanized: dolgan, dulğan, haka (Sakha); Yakut: тыа-киһи, romanized: tıa-kihi) are a Turkic ethnic group who mostly inhabit Krasnoyarsk Krai, Russia. The 2010 Census counted 7,885 Dolgans. This number includes 5,517 in Taymyrsky Dolgano-Nenetsky District.

Dolgan speak the Dolgan language, which is closely related to the Yakut language.

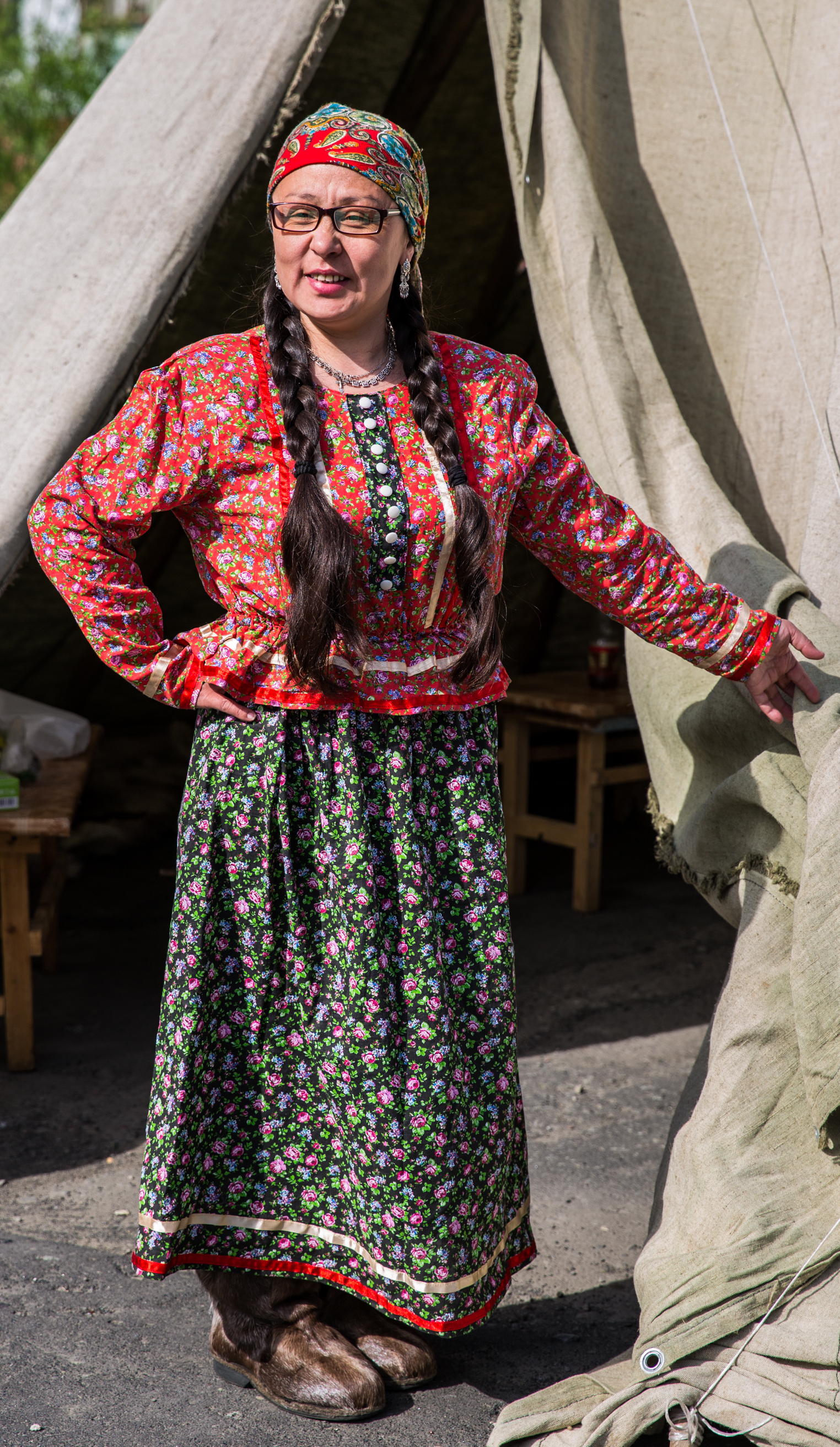
A Dolgan woman in Dudinka

Settlement of Dolgans in the Siberian Federal District by urban and rural settlements in%, 2010 census

Settlement of Dolgans in the Far Eastern Federal District by urban and rural settlements in%, 2010 census

== History ==
In the 17th century, the Dolgans lived in the basins of the Olenyok River and Lena River. They moved to their current location, Taymyr, in the 18th century. The Dolgan identity began to emerge during the 19th and early 20th centuries, under the influence of three groups who migrated to the Krasnoyarsk area from the Lena River and Olenyok River region: Evenks, Sakha (Yakuts), Enets, and the ethnic Russian tundra peasants (зату́ндренные крестья́не, zatúndrennye krest’jáne).

== Culture and livelihood ==
Originally, the Dolgans were nomadic hunters and reindeer herders. However, they were prevented from following a nomadic lifestyle during the Soviet era and required to form kolkhozy (state ‘collective farms’) that – in addition to their traditional activities – engaged in reindeer breeding, fishing, dairy farming and market gardening. In 1983, the anthropologist Shirin Akiner claimed: "Dolgans enjoy full Soviet citizenship. They are found in all occupations, though the majority are peasants and collective farm workers. Their standard of housing is comparable to that of other national groups in the Soviet Union."

== Religion ==
The Dolgan religion is heavily influenced by both the Sakha (Yakut) and Evenk shamanistic beliefs. However, Eastern Orthodox influence from Russians is also present. There are accounts describing the Dolgans as the "most northern conductors of Orthodoxy and Russian culture in Taimyr." Nonetheless, even though many Dolgans were assigned to Orthodoxy and baptized at birth, "they rarely even hold the names that are given to them at baptism." Thus, animism and shamanism continued to strongly shape the life of Dolgans along with Orthodoxy.

== Notable Dolgans ==
- Ogdo Aksyonova – a poet, the founder of Dolgan written literature.
