= Yakut language =

Northern Siberian Turkic language

Yakut
- Sakha
- саха тыла, saxa tıla
- Pronunciation: [säˈχä tʰɯˈɫä]
- Native to: Russia
- Region: Yakutia, Magadan Oblast, Amur Oblast, Krasnoyarsk Krai (Evenkiysky District)
- Ethnicity: Yakuts
- Native speakers: c. 450,000
- Language family: Turkic: Common Turkic; Siberian Turkic; Northern Siberian; Yakut
- Writing system: Cyrillic (formerly Latin and Cyrillic-based)

Official status
- Official language in: Russia: Yakutia

Language codes
- ISO 639-2: sah
- ISO 639-3: sah
- Glottolog: yaku1245
- ELP: Yakut
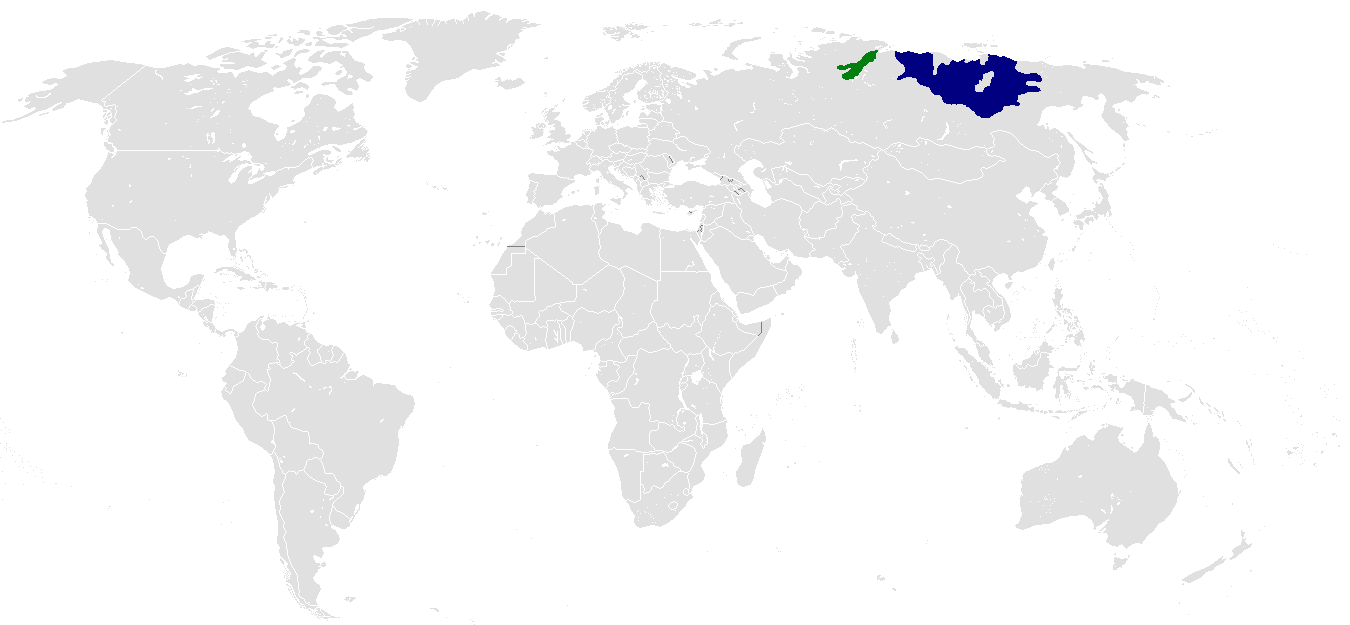
- Sakha language Dolgan language

- Yakut is classified as Vulnerable by the UNESCO Atlas of the World's Languages in Danger

Yakut (/jəˈkuːt/ yə-KOOT), also known as Sakha (/səˈxɑː/ sə-KHAH) or Yakutian, is a Siberian Turkic language spoken by around 450,000 native speakers—primarily by ethnic Yakuts, but also by the Evenki, Even, Yukaghir and the Starozhily peoples. It is one of the official languages of the Sakha Republic, a republic in the Russian Federation.

The Yakut language has a large number of loanwords of Mongolic origin, a layer of vocabulary of unclear origin, as well as numerous recent borrowings from Russian. Like other Turkic languages, Yakut is an agglutinative language and features vowel harmony.

== Classification ==
Yakut is a member of the Northeastern Common Turkic family of languages, which also includes Shor, Tuvan and Dolgan. Like most Turkic languages, Yakut has vowel harmony, is agglutinative and has no grammatical gender. Word order is usually subject–object–verb. Yakut has been influenced by Tungusic and Mongolian languages.

Historically, Yakut left the community of Common Turkic speakers relatively early. Due to this, it diverges in many ways from other Turkic languages and mutual intelligibility between Yakut and other Turkic languages is low and many cognate words are hard to notice when heard. Nevertheless, Yakut contains many features which are important for the reconstruction of Proto-Turkic, such as the preservation of long vowels. Even with significant divergent features, Sakha (i.e. Yakut) is typically grouped with the Common Turkic branch of the family rather than the Oghuric branch with Chuvash. A relatively few scholars (Vasily Radlov, Otto von Böhtlingk, and others) have expressed the view that Sakha (i.e. Yakut) is not Turkic.

== Geographic distribution ==
Yakut is spoken mainly in the Sakha Republic. It is also used by ethnic Yakuts in Khabarovsk Region and a small diaspora in other parts of the Russian Federation, Kazakhstan, Turkey and other parts of the world. Dolgan, a close relative of Yakut, which formerly was considered by some a dialect of Yakut, is spoken by Dolgans in Krasnoyarsk Region. Yakut is widely used as a lingua franca by other ethnic minorities in the Sakha Republic – more Dolgans, Evenks, Evens and Yukagirs speak Yakut rather than their own languages. About 8% of people of ethnicities other than Yakut living in Sakha claimed knowledge of the Yakut language in the 2002 census.

== Phonology ==
=== Consonants ===
Yakut has the following consonants phonemes, where the IPA value is provided in slashes '//' and the native script value is provided in bold followed by the romanization in parentheses.

Consonant phonemes of Yakut
| | | Bilabial | Dental/ alveolar | Palatal | Velar/ uvular | Glottal |
|---|---|---|---|---|---|---|
| Nasal | | /m/ **м** (m) | /n/ **н** (n) | /ɲ/ **нь** (ń) | /ŋ/ **ҥ** (ŋ) | |
| Plosive / Affricate | voiceless | /p/ **п** (p) | /t/ **т** (t) | /t͡ʃ/ **ч** (č) | /k/ **к** (k) | |
| Plosive / Affricate | voiced | /b/ **б** (b) | /d/ **д** (d) | /d͡ʑ/ **дь** (ǰ) | /ɡ/ **г** (g) | |
| Fricative | voiceless | | /s/ **с** (s) | | /χ/ **х** (x) | /h/ **һ** (h) |
| Fricative | voiced | | | | /ʁ/ **ҕ** (ɣ) | |
| Approximant | plain | | /l/ **л** (l) | /j/ **й** (y) | | |
| Approximant | nasalized | | | /ȷ̃/ **ҋ** (ỹ) | | |
| Flap | | | /ɾ/ **р** (r) | | | |

- /n, t, d/ are laminal denti-alveolar [n̪, t̪, d̪], whereas /s, l, ɾ/ are alveolar [s, l, ɾ].
- The nasal glide /ȷ̃/ is not distinguished from /j/ in the orthography, where both are written as ⟨й⟩. Thus **айыы** can be ayïï [ajɯː] 'deed, creation, work' or aỹïï [aȷ̃ɯː] 'sin, transgression'. The nasal glide /ȷ̃/ has a very restricted distribution, appearing in very few words.
- /ɾ/ is pronounced as a flap [ɾ] between vowels, e.g. **орон** (oron) [oɾon] 'place', and as a trill [r] at the end of words, e.g. **тур** (tur) [tur] 'stand'.
  - /ɾ/ does not occur at the beginning of words in native Yakut words; borrowed Russian words with onset /ɾ/ are usually rendered with an epenthetic vowel, e.g. Russian **рама** (rama) > Yakut **араама** (araama) 'frame'.

Yakut is in many ways phonologically unique among the Turkic languages. Yakut and the closely related Dolgan language are the only Turkic languages without postalveolar sibilants. Additionally, no known Turkic languages other than Yakut and Khorasani Turkic have the palatal nasal /ɲ/.

==== Consonant assimilation ====
Consonants at morpheme boundaries undergo extensive assimilation, both progressive and regressive. All suffixes possess numerous allomorphs. For suffixes which begin with a consonant, the surface form of the consonant is conditioned on the stem-final segment. There are four such archiphonemic consonants: G, B, T, and L. Examples of each are provided in the following table for the suffixes -GIt (second-person plural possessive suffix, oɣoɣut 'your [pl.] child'), -BIt (first-person plural possessive suffix, oɣobut, 'our child'), -TA (partitive case suffix, tiiste 'some teeth'), -LArA (third-person plural possessive suffix, oɣoloro 'their child'). Note that the alternation in the vowels is governed by vowel harmony (see the main article and the below section).

Yakut consonant assimilation in suffixes
| Consonant archiphoneme | Immediately preceding sound (example) | | | | | | |
| Consonant archiphoneme | High vowel i, u, ï, ü (kihi) | Low vowel a, e, o, ö (oɣo) | /l/ (uol) | /j,ɾ/ (kötör) | Voiceless consonants (tiis) | /χ/ (ïnaχ) | Nasal (oron) |
|---|---|---|---|---|---|---|---|
| G -GIt | [g] kihi-git | [ɣ] oɣo-ɣut | [g] uol-gut | [g] kötör-güt | [k] tiis-kit | [χ] ïnaχ-χït | [ŋ] oroŋ-ŋut (Note: Regressive velarization.) |
| B -BIt | [b] kihi-bit | [b] oɣo-but | [b] uol-but | [b] kötör-büt | [p] tiis-pit | [p] ïnaχ-pït | [m] orom-mut (Note: Regressive labialization.) |
| T -TA | [t] kihi-te | [t] oɣo-to | [l] uol-la | [d] kötör-dö | [t] tiis-te | [t] ïnaχ-ta | [n] oron-no |
| L -LArA | [l] kihi-lere | [l] oɣo-loro | [l] uol-lara | [d] kötör-dörö | [t] tiis-tere | [t] ïnaχ-tara | [n] oron-noro |
| | 'person' | 'child' | 'boy' | 'bird' | 'tooth' | 'cow' | 'bed' |

There is an additional regular morphophonological pattern for [t]-final stems: they assimilate in place of articulation with an immediately following labial or velar. For example at 'horse' > akkït 'your [pl.] horse', > appït 'our horse'.

==== Debuccalization ====
Yakut initial s- corresponds to initial h- in Dolgan and played an important operative rule in the development of proto-Yakut, ultimately resulting in initial Ø- < *h- < *s- (example: Dolgan huoq and Yakut suox, both meaning "not"). The historical change of *s > h, known as debuccalization, is a common sound-change across the world's languages, being characteristic of such language groups as Greek and Indo-Iranian in their development from Proto-Indo-European, as well as such Turkic languages as Bashkir, e.g. höt 'milk' < *süt.

Debuccalization is also an active phonological process in modern Yakut. Intervocalically the phoneme /s/ becomes [h]. For example the /s/ in кыыс (kïïs) 'girl' becomes [h] between vowels:

kïïs > kïïh-ïm
girl > girl-POSS.1SG
'girl; daughter' > 'my daughter'

=== Vowels ===
Yakut has twenty phonemic vowels: eight short vowels, eight long vowels, (Note: The long vowel phonemes /eː/, /ɔː/, and /øː/ appear in very few words and are thus considered marginal phonemes.) and four diphthongs. The following table gives broad transcriptions for each vowel phoneme, (Note: Note that these vowels are extremely broad. Narrower transcriptions transcribe the high back non-front vowel ы as central /ɨ/. The front non-high unrounded open vowel in э, ээ, and иэ are more accurately [ɛ], [ɛː], [iɛ], respectively.) as well as the native script bold and romanization in italics:

Vowel phonemes of Yakut
| | | Front | | Back | |
| | | unrounded | rounded | unrounded | rounded |
|---|---|---|---|---|---|
| Close | short | /i/ **и** (i) | /y/ **ү** (ü) | /ɯ/ **ы** (ï (Note: ы is occasionally Romanized as y, consistent with the BGN/PCGN romanization of Russian Cyrillic. Turkologists and Altaicists tend to transcribe the vowel as ï, or as ɨ.)) | /u/ **у** (u) |
| Close | long (Note: Some authors romanize long vowels with a macron (e.g. /iː/ ī, /yː/ ǖ) or with a colon (e.g. /iː/ i:/iː, /yː/, ü:/üː).) | /iː/ **ии** (ii) | /yː/ **үү** (üü) | /ɯː/ **ыы** (ïï) | /uː/ **уу** (uu) |
| Diphthong | | /ie/ **иэ** (ie) | /yø/ **үө** (üö) | /ɯa/ **ыа** (ïa) | /uɔ/ **уо** (uo) |
| Open | short | /e/ **э** (e) | /ø/ **ө** (ö) | /a/ **а** (a) | /ɔ/ **о** (o) |
| Open | long | /eː/ **ээ** (ee) | /øː/ **өө** (öö) | /aː/ **аа** (aa) | /ɔː/ **оо** (oo) |

==== Vowel harmony ====
Like other Turkic languages, a characteristic feature of Yakut is progressive vowel harmony. Most root words obey vowel harmony, for example in кэлин (kelin) 'back', all the vowels are front and unrounded, whereas in олоборун (oloborun) 'I live', all the vowels are back and rounded. Yakut's vowel harmony in suffixes is the most complex system in the Turkic family. Vowel harmony is an assimilation process where vowels in one syllable take on certain features of vowels in the preceding syllable. In Yakut, subsequent vowels all take on frontness and all non-low vowels take on lip rounding of preceding syllables' vowels. There are two main rules of vowel harmony:

1. Frontness/backness harmony:
  1. Front vowels are always followed by front vowels.
  2. Back vowels are always followed by back vowels.
2. Rounding harmony:
  1. Unrounded vowels are always followed by unrounded vowels.
  2. Close rounded vowels always occur after close rounded vowels.
  3. Open unrounded vowels **do not** assimilate in rounding with close rounded vowels.

The quality of the diphthongs /ie, ïa, uo, üö/ for the purposes of vowel harmony is determined by the first segment in the diphthong. Taken together, these rules mean that the pattern of subsequent syllables in Yakut is entirely predictable, and all words will follow the following pattern: Like the consonant assimilation rules above, suffixes display numerous allomorphs determined by the stem they attach to. There are two archiphoneme vowels I (an underlyingly high vowel) and A (an underlyingly low vowel).

Yakut vowel harmony
| Category | Final vowel in stem | Suffix vowels |
|---|---|---|
| Unrounded, back | a, aa, ï, ïï, ïa | a, aa, ï, ïï, ïa |
| Unrounded, front | e, ee, i, ii, ie | e, ee, i, ii, ie |
| Rounded back | u, uu, uo | a, aa, u, uu, uo |
| Rounded, front, close | ü, üü, üö | e, ee, ü, üü, üö |
| Rounded, back | o, oo | o, oo, u, uu, uo |
| Rounded, open, low | ö, öö | ö, öö, ü, üü, üö |

Vowel harmony of archiphonemic vowels
| Archiphonemic vowel | Preceding vowel | | | | | |
| Archiphonemic vowel | Front | | | Back | | |
| Archiphonemic vowel | unrounded (i, ii, ie, e, ee) | rounded | | unrounded (ï, ïï, ïa, a, aa) | rounded | |
| Archiphonemic vowel | unrounded (i, ii, ie, e, ee) | high (ü, üü, üö) | low (ö, öö) | unrounded (ï, ïï, ïa, a, aa) | high (u, uu, uo) | low (o, oo) |
|---|---|---|---|---|---|---|
| I | i | ü | | ï | u | |
| A | e | | ö | a | | o |

Examples of I can be seen in the first-person singular possessive agreement suffix -(I)m: (Note: -(I)m indicates that this suffix appears as -m in vowel-final words (e.g. oɣo 'child' > oɣom 'my child'.) as in (a):

aat-**ïm**
name-POSS.1SG
'my name'

et-**im**
meat-POSS.1SG
'my meat'

uol-**um**
son-POSS.1SG
'my son'

üüt-**üm**
milk-POSS.1SG
'my milk'

The underlyingly low vowel phoneme A is represented through the third-person singular agreement suffix -(t)A (Note: Consonants in parentheses indicate that the suffix loses the consonant in consonant-final words, e.g. uol 'son' > uola 'his/her son.') in (b):

aɣa-**ta**
father-POSS.3SG
'his/her father'

iỹe-**te**
mother-POSS.3SG
'his/her mother'

oɣo-**to**
child-POSS.3SG
'his/her child'

töbö-**tö**
top-POSS.3SG
'his/her top'

uol-**a**
son-POSS.3SG
'his/her son'

== Orthography ==
After three earlier phases of development, Yakut is currently written using the Cyrillic script: the modern Yakut alphabet, established in 1939 by the Soviet Union, consists of all the Russian characters with five additional letters and two digraphs for phonemes not present in Russian: Ҕҕ, Ҥҥ, Өө, Һһ, Үү, Дь дь, and Нь нь, as follows:

Yakut Cyrillic alphabet (Сахалыы сурук-бичик, Saxalïï suruk-bičik)
| А а | Б б | В в | Г г | Ҕ ҕ | Д д | Дь дь | Е е | Ё ё |
| Ж ж | З з | И и | Й й | К к | Л л | М м | Н н | Ҥ ҥ |
| Нь нь | О о | Ө ө | П п | Р р | С с | Һ һ | Т т | У у |
| Ү ү | Ф ф | Х х | Ц ц | Ч ч | Ш ш | Щ щ | Ъ ъ | Ы ы |
| Ь ь | Э э | Ю ю | Я я |

Yakut alphabet, letter names, IPA values
| Letter | А | Б | В | Г | Ҕ | Д | Дь | Е | Ё | Ж | З | И | Й | К | Л | М | Н | Ҥ | Нь | О | Ө | П | Р | С | Һ | Т | У | Ү | Ф | Х | Ц | Ч | Ш | Щ | Ъ | Ы | Ь | Э | Ю | Я |
| Name | а | бэ | вэ | гэ | ҕэ | дэ | дьэ | е | ё | жэ | зэ | и | ый | кы | эл | эм | эн | ҥэ | ньэ | о | ө | пэ | эр | эс | һэ | тэ | у | ү | эф | хэ | цэ | че | ша | ща | (Note: кытаанах бэлиэ) | ы | (Note: сымнатар бэлиэ.) | э | ю | я |
| IPA | /a/ | /b/ | /v/ | /g/ | /ɣ/ | /d/ | /d͡ʒ/ | /(j)e/ | /jo/ | /ʒ/ | /z/ | /i/ | /j/, /ȷ̃/ | /k/ | /l/ | /m/ | /n/ | /ŋ/ | /ɲ/ | /ɔ/ | /ø/ | /p/ | /ɾ/ | /s/ | /h/ | /t/ | /u/ | /y/ | /f/ | /χ/ | /t͡s/ | /t͡ʃ/ | /ʃ/ | /ɕː/ | /◌.j/ | /ɯ/ | /◌ʲ/ | /e/ | /ju/ | /ja/ |

Long vowels are represented through the doubling of vowels, e.g. үүт (üüt) /yːt/ 'milk', a practice that many scholars follow in romanizations of the language.

The full Yakut alphabet contains letters for consonant phonemes not present in native words (and thus not indicated in the phonology tables above): the letters В /v/, Е /(j)e/, Ё /jo|/, Ж /ʒ/, З /z/, Ф /f/, Ц /t͡s/, Ш /ʃ/, Щ /ɕː/, Ъ, Ю /ju/, Я /ja/ are used exclusively in Russian loanwords. In addition, in native Yakut words, the soft sign ⟨Ь⟩ is used exclusively in the digraphs ⟨дь⟩ and ⟨нь⟩.

=== Transliteration ===
There are numerous conventions for the Romanization of Yakut. Bibliographic sources and libraries typically use the ALA-LC Romanization tables for non-Slavic languages in Cyrillic script. Linguists often employ Turkological standards for transliteration, or a mixture of Turkological standards and the IPA. In addition, others employ Turkish orthography. Comparison of some of these systems can be seen in the following:

дьон
/d͡ʒon/
people
'people'

айыы
/ajɯː/
creation
'creation'

бу ыт аттааҕар түргэнник сүүрэр
/bu ɯt at.taːɣar tyrgɛn.nɪk syːrɛr/
DEM dog horse-COMP fast-ADV run-PRES
'This dog runs faster than a horse'

эһэ бөрөтөөҕөр күүстээх
/ɛhɛ bøɾøtøːɣør kyːstɛːχ/
bear wolf-COMP strong-have
'A bear is stronger than a wolf'

Comparison of different conventions for transcribing Yakut
| | | дьон | айыы | бу | ыт | аттааҕар | түргэнник | сүүрэр | эһэ | бөрөтөөҕөр | күүстээх | ыһыах |
|---|---|---|---|---|---|---|---|---|---|---|---|---|
| IPA | | /d͡ʒon/ | /ajɯː/ | /bu/ | /ɯt/ | /at.taːɣar/ | /tyrgɛn.nɪk/ | /syːrɛr/ | /ɛhɛ/ | /bøɾøtøːɣør/ | /kyːstɛːχ/ | /ɯhɯ̯aχ/ |
| Turkological | Krueger | ǰon | ajıı | bu | ıt | attaaɣar | türgennik | süürer | ehe | böröötööɣör | küüsteeχ | ıhıaχ |
| Turkological | Johanson | ǰon | ayï: | bu | ït | atta:ɣar | türgännik | sü:rär | ähä | börötö:ɣör | kü:stä:χ | ïhïaχ |
| Turkological | Robbeets & Savalyev | ʤon | ïyïː | bu | ït | attaːɣar | türgennik | süːrer | ehe | börötöːɣör | kü:steːχ | ïhïaχ |
| ALA-LC | | d'on | aĭyy | bu | yt | attaaghar | tu̇rgennik | su̇u̇rer | eḣe | bȯrȯtȯȯghȯr | ku̇u̇steekh | yḣyakh |
| KNAB | | djon | ajy: | bu | yt | atta:ǧar | türgennik | sü:rer | eḩe | börötö:ǧör | kü:ste:h | yḩyah |
| Turkish orthography | | con | ayıı | bu | ıt | attaağar | türgennik | süürer | ehe | börötööğör | küüsteex | ıhıax |
| Wiktionary | | jon | ayıı | bu | ıt | attaağar | türgennik | süürer | ehe | börötööğör | küüsteeq | ıhıaq |

== Grammar ==
=== Syntax ===
The typical word order can be summarized as subject – adverb – object – verb; possessor – possessed; adjective – noun.

=== Pronouns ===
Personal pronouns in Yakut distinguish between first, second, and third persons and singular and plural number.

| | | Singular | Plural |
|---|---|---|---|
| 1st person | | мин (min) | биһиги (bihigi) |
| 2nd person | | эн (en) | эһиги (ehigi) |
| 3rd person | human | кини (Note: Cognate with Turkish kendi (self)) (kini) | кинилэр (kiniler) |
| 3rd person | non-human | ол (ol) | олор (olor) |

Although nouns have no gender, the pronoun system distinguishes between human and non-human in the third person, using кини (kini, 'he/she') to refer to human beings and ол (ol, 'it') to refer to all other things.

=== Grammatical number ===
Nouns have plural and singular forms. The plural is formed with the suffix /-LAr/, which may surface as -лар (-lar), -лэр (-ler), -лөр (-lör), -лор (-lor), -тар (-tar), -тэр (-ter), -төр (-tör), -тор (-tor), -дар (-dar), -дэр (-der), -дөр (-dör), -дор (-dor), -нар (-nar), -нэр (-ner), -нөр (-nör), or -нор (-nor), depending on the preceding consonants and vowels. The plural is used only when referring to a number of things collectively, not when specifying an amount. Nouns have no gender.

| Final sound basics | Plural affix options | Examples |
|---|---|---|
| Vowels, /l/ | -lar, -ler, -lor, -lör | kïïllar 'beasts', eheler 'bears', oɣolor 'children', börölör 'wolves' |
| /k, p, s, t, χ/ | -tar, -ter, -tor, -tör | attar 'horses', külükter 'shadows', ottor, 'herbs', bölöxtör 'groups' |
| /y, r/ | -dar, -der, -dor, -dör | baaydar 'rich people', ederder 'young people' (Note: baydar 'rich people' and ederder 'young' people are examples of predicative adjectives (i.e. baay 'rich', eder 'young') being pluralized) xotoydor 'eagles', kötördör 'birds' |
| /m, n, ŋ/ | -nar, -ner, -nor, -nör | kïïmnar 'sparks', ilimner 'fishing nets', oronnor 'beds', bödöŋnör 'large ones' |

There is a parallel construction with plural suffix -ттАр, which can even be added to adjectives e.g.

- уол (uol) 'boy; son' > уолаттар (uolattar),
- эр 'man' > эрэттэр or folkloric эрэн (cf. Uzbek folkloric eran)
- хотун 'noblewoman' > хотуттар or хотут
- тойон 'commander' > тойоттор or тойот
- оҕонньор 'old man, husband' > оҕонньоттор
- кэм 'time' > кэммит
- дьон 'people' > дьоммут
- ойун 'shaman' > ойууттар
- доҕор 'friend' > доҕоттор
- күөл 'lake' > күөлэттэр
- хоһуун 'hard-working' > хоһууттар
- буур 'male' (of deer and elk) > буураттар ('male deers')
- кыыс (kïïs) 'girl; daughter' > кыргыттар (kïrgïttar) (standard, suppletive) or кыыстар (dialectal, regular).

The word кыргыттар, disregarding the composite -(ы)ттар plural suffix, has cognates in numerous Turkic languages, such as Uzbek (qirqin 'bondwoman'), Bashkir, Tatar, Kyrgyz (кыз-кыркын 'girls'), Chuvash (хӑрхӑм), Turkmen (gyrnak) and extinct Qarakhanid, Khwarezmian and Chaghatay.

=== Nominal inflection (cases) ===
Only Sakha (Yakut) has a rich case system that differs markedly from all the other Siberian Turkic languages. It has retained the ancient comitative case from Old Turkic (due to strong influence from Mongolian) while in other Turkic languages, the old comitative has become an instrumental case. However, in Sakha language the Old Turkic locative case has come to denote partitive case, thus leaving no case form for the function of locative. Instead, locative, dative and allative cases are realized through Common Turkic dative suffix:

Норуокка "хайа хаппыыстата" диэн аатынан биллэр хайаҕа үүнэр үүнээйи.
A plant known among locals as "mountain cabbage" that grows on a mountain.

where -ҕа is dative and хайаҕа literally means "to the mountain". Furthermore (in addition to locative), genitive and equative cases are lost as well. Yakut has eight grammatical cases: nominative (unmarked), accusative -(n)I, dative -GA, partitive -TA, ablative -(t)tan, instrumental -(I)nAn, comitative -LI:n, and comparative -TA:ɣAr. Examples of these are shown in the following table for a vowel-final stem eye (of Mongolian origin) 'peace' and a consonant-final stem uot 'fire':

| | eye 'peace' | uot 'fire' |
|---|---|---|
| Nominative | eye | uot |
| Accusative | eyeni | uotu |
| Dative | eyeɣe | uokka |
| Partitive (Note: Sakha partitive suffix is believed by some linguists to be an innovation stemming from the influence of Evenki which led the Old Turkic locative suffix to assume partitive function in Sakha; no other Turkic language has the partitive other than Khalaj and (nearly-extinct) Tofa. Sakha partitive is similar to the corresponding Finnish partitive case.) | eyete | uotta |
| Ablative (Note: The Ablative suffix appears as -TAn following a consonant and -T:An following a vowel. Clear examples of the former are oχ 'arrow' → oχton 'from an/the arrow', oχtorton 'from (the) arrows'.) | eyetten | uottan |
| Instrumental | eyenen | uotunan |
| Comitative | eyeli:n | uottu:n |
| Comparative (Note: Sakha is the only language within the Turkic family to have comparative case.) | eyete:ɣer | uotta:ɣar |

The partitive object case indicates that only part of an object is affected, e.g.:

Uː-ta/kïmïs-ta is!
water-PTV/kumis-PTV drink-IMP.2SG
Drink some water/kumis!

The corresponding expression below with the object in the accusative denotes wholeness:

Uː-nu/kïmïh-ï is!
water-ACC/kumis-ACC drink-IMP.2SG
Drink [all] the water/kumis!

The partitive is only used in imperative or necessitative expressions, e.g.

Uː-ta/kïmïs-ta aɣal-ϊaχ-χa naːda.
water-PTV/kumis-PTV bring-PRSP-DAT necessary.
One has to bring some water/kumis.

Note the word naːda is borrowed from Russian надо (must).

A notable detail about Yakut case is the absence of the genitive, a feature which some argue is due to historical contact with Evenki (a Tungusic language), the language with which Sakha (i.e. Yakut) was in most intensive contact. Possessors are unmarked, with the possessive relationship only being realized on the possessed noun itself through the possessive suffix where -(T)A suffixing marks third-person possession, -(I)m/-(I)ŋ for first/second singular and -BIt/-GIt for first/second plural.

min oɣo-m, kïrgït:ar-ïŋ / bihigi oɣo-but, kïrgït:ar-gït
1SG.NOM child-POSS.1SG, girls-POSS.2SG / 1PL.NOM child-POSS.1PL, girls-POSS.2PL
'my son, your daughters' / 'our child, your girls'

Maša sïba:jba-ta/χalï:m-a
Masha.NOM wedding-POSS.3SG/bridewealth-POSS.3SG
'Masha's wedding/bridewealth'

Note the alternation between dative suffixes with and without possessive marking:

Хос-ко киир-дэ.
room-DAT enter-PST.3SG.
(S/he) entered a/the room.

Хоһ-у-гар киир-дэ.
room-POSS.3SG-DAT enter-PST.3SG.
(S/he) entered his/her room.

Both -ко and -гар are dative suffixes, and the possessive suffix rendered as -у means "their-SG/its".

=== Verbal inflection ===
==== Tenses ====
E. I. Korkina (1970) enumerates following tenses: present-future tense, future tense and eight forms of past tense (including imperfect).

Sakha's imperfect past has both (a) synthetic and (b) analytic forms, based on the aorist suffix -Ar, common to all Turkic languages. This is considered by some to be another influence from Even, a Tungusic language.

Биһиги иннибитинэ бу кыбартыыра-ҕа оҕо-лоох ыал олор-оро.
PRO.1PL before-1PL this apartment-DAT child-PSSM family live-PST.NPRF.3SG
Before us, a family with children used to live at this apartment.

Биһиги иннибитинэ бу кыбартыыра-ҕа оҕо-лоох ыал олор-ор этэ.
PRO.1PL before-1PL this apartment-DAT child-PSSM family live-PRES.3SG be.PST.3SG
Before us, a family with children used to live at this apartment.

==== Imperative ====
Sakha, under Evenki/Even contact influence, has developed a distinction in imperative: immediate imperative ("do now!") and future/remote imperative ("do later!").

| | Positive | Negative |
|---|---|---|
| Immediate | -∅/-(I)ŋ | -ma-∅/-ma-(I)ŋ |
| Remote | -A:r/-A:r-(I)ŋ | -(I)m-A:r/-(I)m-A:r-(I)ŋ |

Immediate imperative example:

Николай Атласов алаадьыны буһарыы туһунан кэпсиирин истиҥ
Listen to Nikolay Atlasov’s talk about preparing oladyi.

==== Denominal verbs ====
Common Turkic has denominal suffix -LA, used to create verbs from nouns (i.e. Uzbek tişla= 'to bite' from tiş 'tooth'). The suffix is also present in Sakha (in various shapes, due to vowel harmony), but Sakha takes it a step further: theoretically verbs can be formed with any noun by appending the denominal suffix:

Арай биирдэ, теннистии туран, хараҕым ааһан иһэр кыыска хатана түспүтэ.
Once upon a time, while playing tennis, my eyes caught sight of a girl passing by.

where the word for “playing tennis” (теннистии) is derived from теннистээ, “to play tennis”.

==== Converbs ====
Sakha converbs end in -(A)n as opposed to Common Turkic -(I)B. They express simultaneous and sequential action and are also used with auxiliary verbs, preceding them:

Күлүгүн кытта охсуһан таҕыстыҥ
You continuously fought with his shadow.

Simultaneous and sequential actions are expressed through the converbial suffix -а(н):

Самаан сайын бүтэн, айылҕа барахсан уһун улук уутугар оҥостордуу от-мас хагдарыйан күөх солко симэҕин ыһыктар күһүҥҥү тымныы салгыннаах, сиппэрэҥ күннэр тураллар
Summer having passed, very cold and sleety days of autumn arise wherein mother nature dresses in a robe made green by plants growing in shallow waters.

Кэлэн иһэллэр, итириктэр
After coming, they would drink (and) get drunk.

=== Questions ===
The Sakha yes–no question marker is enclitic duo or du:, whereas almost all other Turkic languages use markers of the type -mi, compare:

Күөрэгэй ырыатын истэҕин дуо?
küöregej ïrïa-tï-n ist-eɣin =duo?
lark-NOM.SG song-POSS.3SG-ACC.SG hear-PRS.2SG =Q
Do you hear the lark's song?

and the same sentence in Uzbek (note the question suffix -mi in contrast to Sakha):

Törğay jirini eşit(a)yapsanmi?

Question words in Yakut remain in-situ; they do not move to the front of the sentence.

Interrogative pronouns in Sakha
| Pronoun | Translation |
|---|---|
| ким | who |
| туох | what |
| тоҕо | why |
| төһө | how many, how much |
| хас | how many, how much |
| хачча | how much |
| хаччаҕа | when |
| хаһан | when |
| ханна | where |
| ханнык | which |
| хайа | which, how |
| хайдах | how |
| хайаа= | do what? |

=== Ordinal numbers ===
Ordinals are formed by appending -үс to numerals:

Казань - дойдубут үһүс тэбэр сүрэҕэ
Qazan - the third beating heart of our country

=== Rusisms ===
Together with having a considerable number of Russian loanwords, Sakha language features Russisms in colloquial speech. Example:

Курууса жарылабын.
I am frying a chicken

Both words in the sentence above are loans from Russian: "Курууса" - (курица "kuritsa"), 'chicken"; "жарылабын" - cf. "жарить", 'to fry'.

== Vocabulary ==
The Yakut lexicon includes loans from Russian, Mongolic, Evenki, and number of words from other languages or of unknown origin. The Mongolic loans do not appear to be traceable to any specific Mongolic language, but a few have been traced to Buryat and Khalkha Mongolian. They are widely dispersed through various categories of words with words relating to the home and law having the most Mongolic loans. Russian loans on the contrary are much more widespread but less evenly dispersed though various types of words. Words relating to the modern world, clothing, and the home have the most Russian influence.

== Oral and written literature ==
The Yakut have a tradition of oral epic in their language called Олоҥхо ("Olonkho"), traditionally performed by skilled performers. The subject matter is based on Yakut mythology and legends. Versions of many Olonkho poems have been written down and translated since the 19th century, but only a very few older performers of the oral Olonkho tradition are still alive. They have begun a program to teach young people to sing this in their language and revive it, though in a modified form.

The first printing in Yakut was a part of a book by Nicolaas Witsen published in 1692 in Amsterdam.

In 2005, Marianne Beerle-Moor, director of the Institute for Bible Translation, Russia/CIS, was awarded the Order of Civil Valour by the Republic of Sakha (Yakutia) for the translation of the New Testament into Yakut.

Probably the first-ever Islamic book in Sakha language, "Билсиҥ: Ислам" ("Get to know: Islam"), written by a Sakha convert born in the village of Asyma, was published in 2012. This short book (52 pages) is intended to be a condensed introduction to the fundamentals of Islam in Sakha. The author occasionally employs native terms (which are also used in Olonkho corpus) to render some Islamic concepts, such as the jinn.

== Example ==
Article 1 of the Universal Declaration of Human Rights:

| Novgorodov alphabet (1920–1929) | зɔn barɯta beje sꭣltatɯgar ꭣnna bɯra:bɯgar teŋ bꭣlan tꭢry:ler. kiniler barɯ ꭢrkꭢn ꭢjdꭢ:q, sꭣbasta:q bꭣlan tꭢry:ler, ꭣnna beje bejeleriger tɯlga ki:riniges bɯhɯ:lara dɔʃɔrdɔhu: tɯ:nnɯ:q bꭣlꭣqta:q. |
| Yañalif (1929–1939) | Çon ʙarьta ʙeje suoltatьgar uonna ʙьraaʙьgar teꞑ ʙuolan tɵryyller. Kiniler ʙarь ɵrkɵn ɵjdɵɵq, suoʙastaaq ʙuolan tɵryyller, uonna ʙeje ʙejeleriger tьlga kiiriniges ʙьhььlara doƣordohuu tььnnaaq ʙuoluoqtaaq. |
| Cyrillic (1939–present) | Дьон (Note: Borrowed from Mongolian зон.) барыта бэйэ (Note: Borrowed from Evenki.) суолтатыгар уонна быраабыгар (Note: The root of the word, быраап, is derived from Russian право.) тэҥ буолан төрүүллэр. Кинилэр бары өркөн өйдөөх, суобастаах (Note: The root of this loanword, суобас, is from Russian совесть - conscience.) буолан төрүүллэр, уонна бэйэ бэйэлэригэр тылга кииринигэс быһыылара доҕордоһуу (Note: From доҕор 'friend', of Mongolic origin.) тыыннаах буолуохтаах. |
| Common Turkic alphabet | Con barıta beye suoltatıgar uonna bıraabıgar teñ buolan törüüller. Kiniler barı örkön öydööx, suobastaax buolan törüüller, uonna beye beyeleriger tılga kiiriniges bıhıılara doğorhuu tıınnaax buoluoxtaax. |
| International Phonetic Alphabet | [ɟ͡ʝɔn barɯta beje su͜ɔɫtatɯgar u͜ɔnna bɯraːbɯgar teŋ bu͜ɔɫan tøryːller ‖ kiniler barɯ ørkøn øjdøːx su͜ɔbastaːχ bu͜ɔɫan tøryːller u͜ɔnna beje bejeleriger tɯɫga kiːriniges bɯhɯːɫara dɔʁɔrdɔhuː tɯːnnaːq bu͜ɔɫu͜ɔχtaːχ ǁ] |
| English translation | All human beings are born free and equal in dignity and rights. They are endowed with reason and conscience and should act towards one another in a spirit of brotherhood. |

== See also ==
- Yakuts
- Dolgan language
- Semyon Novgorodov – the inventor of the first IPA-based Yakut alphabet

== Sources ==
- Anderson, Gregory D. S. (1998). "Historical Aspects of Yakut (Saxa) Phonology". Turkic Languages. 2 (2): 1–32.
- Antonov, N. K. (1997). Tenshev, E. R. (ed.). Yazyki mira (seriya knig) (in Russian). Indrik (izdatelstvo). pp. 513–524. ISBN 5-85759-061-2.
- Baker, Mark C; Vinokurova, Nadya (2010). "Two modalities of case assignment: case in Sakha". Natural Language and Linguistic Theory. 28 (3): 593–642. doi:10.1007/s11049-010-9105-1. S2CID 18614663.
- Forsyth, James (1994). A History of the Peoples of Siberia: Russia's North Asian Colony 1581-1990. Cambridge University Press. ISBN 9780521477710.
- Johanson, Lars (2021). Turkic. Cambridge: Cambridge University Press. pp. 20, 24.
- Kharitonov, L. N. (1947). Samouchitel' jakutskogo jazyka (in Russian). Jakutskoe knizhnoe izdatel'stvo.
- Kirişçioğlu, M. Fatih (1999). Saha (Yakut) Türkçesi Grameri (in Turkish). Ankara: Türk Dil Kurumu. ISBN 975-16-0587-3.
- Krueger, John R. (1962). Yakut Manual. Bloomington: Indiana University Press.
- Menz, Astrid; Monastyrev, Vladimir (2022). "Yakut". In Johanson, Lars; Csató, Éva Á. (eds.). The Turkic Languages (Second ed.). Routledge. pp. 444–59. doi:10.4324/9781003243809. ISBN 978-0-415-73856-9. S2CID 243795171.
- Robbeets, Martine; Savalyev, Alexander (2020). "Romanization Conventions". In Robbeets, Martine; Savalyev, Alexander (eds.). The Oxford Guide to the Transeurasian Languages. Oxford University Press. pp. lii–lxxxii.
- Pakendorf, Brigitte (2007). Contact in the prehistory of the Sakha (Yakuts): Linguistic and genetic perspectives (Thesis). Universiteit Leiden.
- Pakendorf, Brigitte; Stapert, Eugénie (2020). "Sakha and Dolgan, the North Siberian Turkic Languages". In Robbeets, Martine; Savalyev, Alexander (eds.). The Oxford Guide to the Transeurasian Languages. Oxford University Press. pp. 430–45. doi:10.1093/oso/9780198804628.003.0027. ISBN 978-0-19-880462-8.
- Petrova, Nyurguyana (2011). Lexicon and Clause-Linkage Properties of the Converbal Constructions in Sakha (Yakut) (Thesis). University of Buffalo.
- Stachowski, Marek; Menz, Astrid (1998). "Yakut". In Johanson, Lars; Csató, Éva Á. (eds.). The Turkic Languages. Routledge.
- Vinokurova, Nadezhda (2005). Lexical Categories and Argument Structure: A study with reference to Sakha (Thesis). Universiteit Utrecht.
