= Medal "For Merit in Conducting the All-Russian Population Census" =

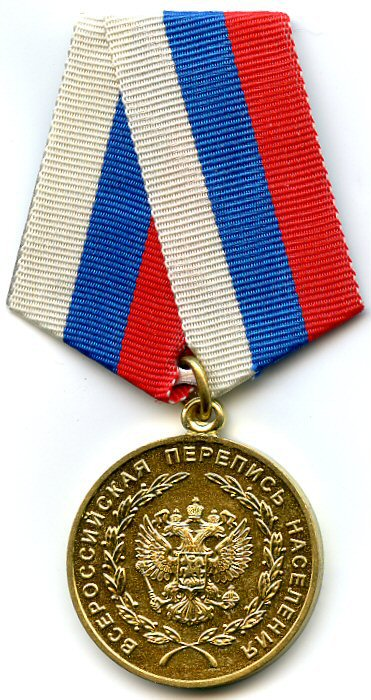
- Medal "For Merit in Conducting the All-Russian Population Census" (obverse)
- Type: State Decoration
- Presented by: Russian Federation
- Eligibility: Russian citizens
- Status: Active
- Established: October 14, 2002
- Ribbon of the Medal "For Merit in Conducting the All-Russian Population Census"

Precedence
- Next (higher): Jubilee Medal "100 Years of the Trans-Siberian Railway"
- Next (lower): Medal "In Commemoration of the 300th Anniversary of Saint Petersburg"

Medal "For Merit in Conducting the All-Russian Population Census" (Russian: Медаль «За заслуги в проведении Всероссийской переписи населения») is a Jubilee Medal of the Russian Federation. It was established by Decree No. 1151 of the President of the Russian Federation dated October 14, 2002, as a state award of the Russian Federation. Since September 7, 2010, the medal has ceased to be a state award of the Russian Federation.

== Regulations ==
The medal is awarded to citizens who made a significant contribution to the preparation and conduct of the All-Russian Population Census.

The medal is worn on the left chest and is positioned after the "100th Anniversary of the Trans-Siberian Railway" commemorative medal.

== Description ==
The medal is made of brass and is circular, 32 mm in diameter, with a raised border on both sides.

The obverse of the medal features the State Emblem of the Russian Federation, framed by laurel branches. Along the edge of the medal is the inscription in raised letters: "All-Russian Population Census".

The reverse of the medal features the inscription in raised letters: "For services in conducting the All-Russian Population Census." Beneath the inscription are the numbers "2002."

The medal is attached to a pentagonal base with a loop and ring, covered with a silk moiré tricolor ribbon matching the colors of the State Flag of the Russian Federation. The ribbon is 24 mm wide.

A total of approximately 90,000 people have been awarded the medal.
