= Dolgan language =

Northern Siberian Turkic language

Dolgan
- долган, dolgan һака, haka
- Pronunciation: [dɔlgæn]
- Native to: Russia
- Region: Taymyrsky Dolgano-Nenetsky District, Krasnoyarsk Krai
- Ethnicity: Dolgans
- Native speakers: 5,300 (2020 census)
- Language family: Turkic: Common Turkic; Siberian Turkic; Northern Siberian; Dolgan
- Dialects: Western (Norilsk, Yenisey); Central (Avam); Eastern (Khatanga)

Language codes
- ISO 639-3: dlg
- Glottolog: dolg1241
- ELP: Dolgan
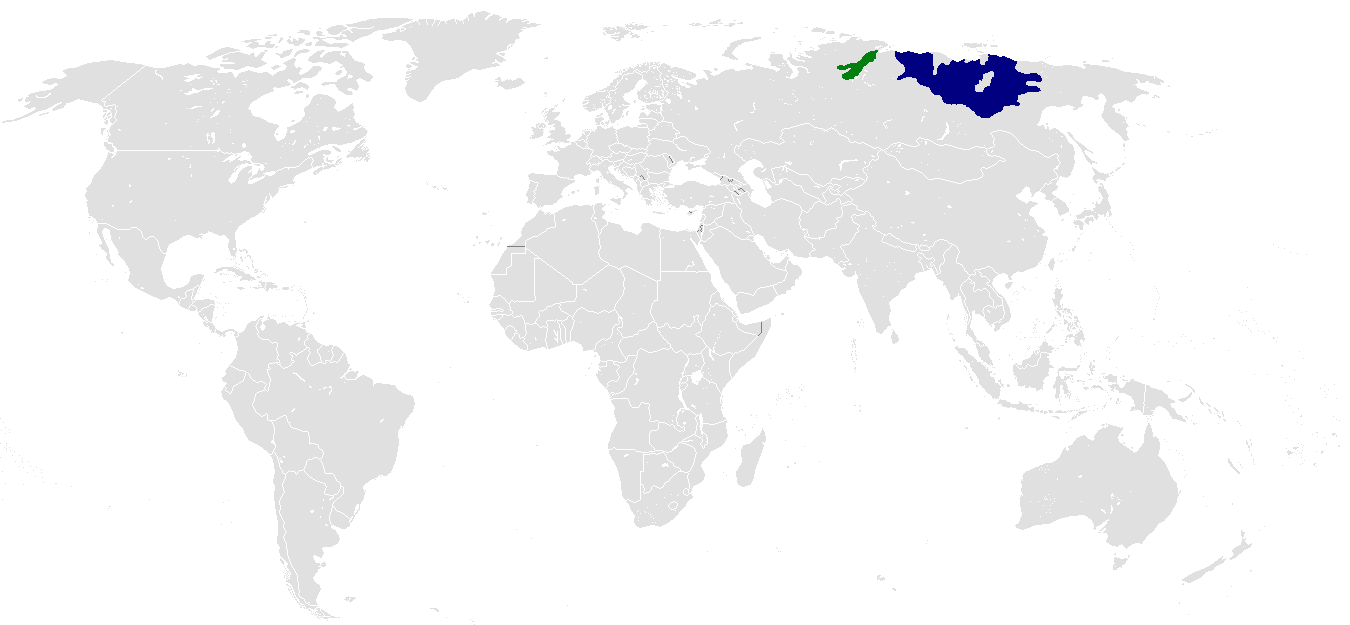
- Sakha language Dolgan language

- Dolgan is classified as Definitely Endangered by the UNESCO Atlas of the World's Languages in Danger

The Dolgan language (долган, dolgan or һака, haka) is an endangered Turkic language, spoken in the Taymyr Peninsula in Russia. The speakers are known as the Dolgans. The word "Dolgan", derived from Evenki, means 'tribe living on the middle reaches of the river'. This is most likely signifying the geographical location of the Dolgan tribe. Its closest relative is Sakha.

The language is very local and restricted to a certain area and has declined in usage over the years. As of 2020 there are only about 5,350 speakers of the language. The language has experienced a few changes since the beginning of its formation, such as alphabet and phrasing terms. The issue as of recently has become the weak integration of this local language within families with mixed marriages. Instead of speaking either of the parents' local languages, the family incorporates Russian as the more dominant language to ease interfamilial and external communication. This results in children learning the language only slightly or as a second language. Over generations, the language continues to fade. In 1999, however, some children were apparently learning Dolgan, with Russian also being learned at an early age.

== Classification ==
Dolgan, along with its close relative Sakha (Yakut), belongs to the North Siberian subbranch of the Turkic language family. Like most other Turkic languages, Dolgan has vowel harmony, agglutinative morphology, subject-object-verb word order, and lacks grammatical gender. Dolgan is linguistically relatively close to its nearest relative Sakha (also known as Yakut), which has led researchers for a long time to account for it as a variety of the latter, cf. Dolgikh's (1963: 129) statement in his well-known paper on the origin of the Dolgans: " ... долганский язык является диалектом якутского языка." ‘[ ...] the Dolgan language is a dialect of the Yakut language.’. Only in 1985 did Elizaveta Ubryatova account for Dolgan as a separate language, namely in her monograph on the language of the Norilsk Dolgans.

=== Sample comparison with Yakut (in Latin) ===
Dolgan:

"Uskuolaga üörenebin."
"Dolgannıı kepsetebin."
"Kaar"
"Tuogunan hir barıta habıllınna?"

Yakut:

"Oskuolağa üörenebin."
"Saxalıı kepsetebin."
"Xaar"
"Tugunan sir barıta sabılınna?"

Literal English translation:

"(I am) studying at school."
"(I) speak Yakut (Dolgan)."
"Snow"
"What covered the ground?"

== History ==
The Dolgan language started out having a Latin alphabet in the early 20th century. Over time, the Cyrillic alphabet was implemented instead since it is the same alphabet used by the related language, Yakut. Evenki's influence on Dolgan can explain, in part, why it is considered a separate language from Yakut. Dolgan has made appearances in newspapers, such as the Taymyr, as well as schools starting around the time of the 60s.

Certain words in the language were developed from geographical implications that have been present since the start of the Dolgan language. For instance, the directional terms tās (1. south 2. east) and muora (1. north 2. west) are representative of the corresponding landscapes. Tās is related to the word stone, and the southeast topography of the native region, Taymyr Peninsula, is covered by the Putorana Mountains. Similarly, muora denotes "sea" where the western zone of Taymyr has access to the sea shore. At the same time, southwest, uhä, and northeast, allara, have no significance in geographical terms relative to Taymyr.

== Phonology ==
=== Vowels ===
	Front		Back	
Close	i iː	y yː	ɯ ɯː	u uː
Mid	e eː	ø øː	o oː	
Open			a aː	

=== Consonants ===
		Bilabial	Dental	Palatal	Velar	Glottal
Plosive	voiceless	p	t	c	k	
Plosive	voiced	b	d	ɟ	ɡ	
Fricative			s		ɣ	h
Affricate	voiceless			tʃ		
Affricate	voiced			dʒ		
Nasal		m	n	ɲ	ŋ	
Liquid			r			
Approximant			l	j		

Dolgan has the following phonetic characteristics:

- Diphthongisation of the Turkish medium vowels [o, e, ö] in the root syllable
- Labial and palatal vowel harmony in the native words
- Transition of the initial Turkish c- into h-, loss of the uvular x, ҕ: Yakut; саха ~ Dolgan hака (self)

== Writing system ==
Over time, the language itself has changed and adapted. Even during the time period when it had a Cyrillic alphabet, it changed over the years. The first version of alphabet of the language had the following appearance: А а, Б б, В в, Г г, Д д, Дь дь, Е е, Ё ё, Ж ж, З з, И и, Иэ иэ, Й й, К к, Л л, М м, Н н, Ӈ ӈ, Нь нь, О о, Ө ө, П п, Р р, С с, Т т, У у, Уо уо, Ү ү, Үө үө, Ф ф, Х х, Һ һ, Ц ц, Ч ч, Ш ш, Щ щ, Ъ ъ, Ы ы, Ыа ыа, Ь ь, Э э, Ю ю, Я я.

The current Dolgan alphabet is still Cyrillic and looks as follows: А а, Б б, В в, Г г, Д д, Е е, Ё ё, Ж ж, З з, И и, Й й, К к, Л л, М м, Н н, Ӈ ӈ, О о, Ө ө, П п, Р р, С с, Т т, У у, Ү ү, Ф ф, Х х, Һ һ, Ц ц, Ч ч, Ш ш, Щ щ, Ъ ъ, Ы ы, Ь ь, Э э, Ю ю, Я я.

== Grammar ==
=== Morphology ===
The composition of morphological categories in the noun is: case, number, possession, and in the verb is: voice, aspect, mode, time, person and number. Dolgan language exhibits eight grammatical cases. In contrast in the Sakha language (i.e. Yakut), the partitive is used in the possessive declension to address the accusative case, and joint case serves to structure two similar parts of a sentence. Another notable difference from Sakha is that Dolgan does not have comitative case. In conjugation of a verb in the common form of -ааччы, the paradigms of Dolgan inclination were preserved with the word баар.

=== Cases ===
The table below lists case forms for the noun таба 'deer' ('camel' in Common Turkic):

Case	Interrogative	Suffix	deer
Nominative	Ким? Туок?	∅	таба
Accusative	Кими? Туогу?	-ни, -ны, -ну, -нү	табаны
Partitive	Кимнэ? Туокта?	-та, -тэ, -то, -тө	табата
Dative-Locative	Кимиэкэ? Туокка? Кайдиэк? Канна? Төһөгө?	-га, -ге, -го, -гө, -гар, -гер, -гор, -гөр, -р	табага
Ablative	Кимтэн? Туоктан? Кайдиэгиттэн? Кантан?	-ттан, -ттэн, -ттон, -ттөн	табаттан
Instrumental	Киминэн? Туогунан? Канан?	-ннан, -ннэн, -ннон, -ннөн	табаннан
Comparative	Кимнээгэр? Туоктаагар?	-таагар, -тээгэр, -тоогор, -төгөөр	табатаагар
Comitative (obsolete)	Кимниин? Туоктуун?	-лыын (Note: This suffix is regarded as a comitative case suffix in several existing grammars of Dolgan, however the suffix has lost its comitative sense and is used to denote sociativity. More recent scholarship excludes the suffix from being a case.)	табалыын

== Bibliography ==
- Ager, Simon. (2011). Dolgan. Omniglot. Retrieved from http://www.omniglot.com/writing/ dolgan.htm.
- Андросова, С. И. (1997). "Долганский язык". Языки мира: Тюркские языки. М.
- Chris Lasse Däbritz. (2022), A Grammar of Dolgan: A Northern Siberian Turkic Language of the Taimyr Peninsula: 18, BRILL
- Dolgikh, B. O. (1963). Proiskhozhdenie Dolgan (Origin of the Dolgan). Trudy Instituta, Etnografii AN SSSR 84:92-141.
- Grachyova, Galina. (1990). Dolgan. In Collis, Dirmid R. F. (ed.), Arctic Languages: An Awakening, 112–114.
- Grenoble, Lenore A. and Lindsay J. Whaley. (2006). Saving Languages: An Introduction to Language Revitalization. Cambridge: Cambridge University Press.
- Johanson, Lars (2021). Turkic. Cambridge: Cambridge University Press. pp. 20, 24.
- Lewis, E. Glyn. (1971). Migration and Language in the USSR. The International Migration Review: The Impact of Migration on Language Maintenance and Language Shift, 5(2), 147-179.
- Li, Yong-Sŏng. (2011). A study of Dolgan. (Altaic language series, 05.) Seoul: Seoul National University Press.
- Pakendorf, Brigitte; Stapert, Eugénie (2020). "Sakha and Dolgan, the North Siberian Turkic Languages". In Robbeets, Martine; Savalyev, Alexander (eds.). The Oxford Guide to the Transeurasian Languages. Oxford University Press. pp. 430–45. doi:10.1093/oso/9780198804628.003.0027. ISBN 978-0-19-880462-8.
- Stachowski, Marek (1993). Dolganischer Wortschatz. Krakow: Uniwersytet Jagielloński. (in German)
- Stachowski, Marek (2010). "Considerations on the system and the origins of the terms for cardinal points in the Dolgan language" (PDF). Incontri Linguistici. 33: 233–242. JSTOR 3002797.
- Marten, H.F., Rießler, M., Saarikivi, J., Toivanen, R. (2015). Cultural and Linguistic Minorities in the Russian Federation and the European Union: Comparative Studies on Equality and Diversity. Switzerland: Springer.
- Minahan, James B. (2014). Dolgan in Ethnic Groups of North, East, and Central Asia: An Encyclopedia. (63–67). Santa Barbara: ABC-CLIO, LLC.
- Vahtre, Lauri. (1991). The Dolgans. The Red Book. Retrieved from https://www.eki.ee/books/ redbook/dolgans.shtml.
