= Ethnic groups in Russia =

Russia, as the largest country in the world, has great ethnic diversity. It is a multinational state and home to over 190 ethnic groups countrywide. According to the population census at the end of 2021, more than 147.1 million people lived in Russia, which is 4.3 million more than in the 2010 census, or 3.03%. At the same time, only 130.587 million census participants indicated their nationality. The top fifteen largest nations besides Russians included in descending order: Tatars, Chechens, Bashkirs, Chuvash, Avars, Armenians, Ukrainians, Dargins, Kazakhs, Kumyks, Kabardins, Ingush, Lezgins and Ossetians. Population censuses in Russia allow citizens to report their nationality according not only to their ancestry, but also to self-identification. The 83 federal subjects which together constitute the Russian Federation include:

- 21 national republics (self-governing regions organized along ethnic lines)
- 4 autonomous okrugs (usually with substantial or predominant ethnic minority)
- 1 autonomous oblast

== Ethnic groups of Russia, 1926–2021 ==
=== 1926–1979 ===
Population counts and percentage from the 1926, 1939, 1959, and 1979 censuses
Ethnic group	Year									
Ethnic group	1926 Census		1939 Census		1959 Census		1970 Census		1979 Census	
Ethnic group	Number	%	Number	%	Number	%	Number	%	Number	%
Russians	71,374,283	78.1%	89,747,795	82.9%	97,863,579	83.3%	107,747,630	82.8%	113,521,881	82.6%
Tatars	3,926,053	3.2%	3,682,956	3.4%	4,074,253	3.5%	4,577,061	3.5%	5,055,757	3.6%
Chechens	318,361	0.34%	400,325	0.37%	261,311	0.22%	572,220	0.44%	712,161	0.52%
Bashkir	738,861	0.80%	824,537	0.76%	953,801	0.81%	1,180,913	0.91%	1,290,994	0.94%
Chuvashs	1,112,478	1.20%	1,346,232	1.24%	1,436,218	1.22%	1,637,028	1.26%	1,689,847	1.23%
Avars	178,263	0.19%	235,715	0.22%	249,529	0.21%	361,613	0.28%	438,306	0.32%
Armenians	183,785	0.20%	205,233	0.19%	255,978	0.22%	298,718	0.23%	364,570	0.27%
Ukrainians	6,870,976	7.9%	3,205,061	3.0%	3,359,083	2.9%	3,345,885	2.6%	3,657,647	2.7%
Dargins	125,759	0.14%	152,007	0.14%	152,563	0.13%	224,172	0.17%	280,444	0.20%
Kazakhs	136,501	0.15%	356,500	0.33%	382,431	0.33%	477,820	0.37%	518,060	0.38%
Kumyks	94,509	0.10%	110,299	0.10%	132,896	0.11%	186,690	0.14%	225,800	0.16%
Kabardins	139,864	0.15%	161,216	0.15%	200,634	0.17%	277,435	0.21%	318,822	0.23%
Ingush	72,137	0.08%	90,980	0.08%	55,799	0.05%	137,380	0.11%	165,997	0.12%
Lezgins	92,937	0.10%	100,328	0.09%	114,210	0.10%	170,494	0.13%	202,854	0.15%
Ossetians	157,280	0.17%	195,624	0.18%	247,834	0.21%	313,458	0.24%	352,080	0.26%
Mordvins	1,306,798	1.41%	1,375,558	1.27%	1,211,105	1.03%	1,177,492	0.91%	1,111,075	0.81%
Yakuts (Note: (including Dolgans 1939–1959))	240,682	0.26%	241,870	0.22%	236,125	0.20%	295,223	0.23%	326,531	0.24%
Azerbaijanis	24,335	0.03%	43,014	0.04%	70,947	0.06%	95,689	0.07%	152,421	0.11%
Buryats (Note: (including Soyots 1939–1989))	237,490	0.26%	220,618	0.20%	251,504	0.21%	312,847	0.24%	349,760	0.25%
Mari	427,874	0.46%	476,314	0.44%	498,066	0.42%	581,082	0.45%	599,637	0.44%
Udmurts (Note: (including Besermyan 1939–1989))	503,970	0.54%	599,893	0.55%	615,640	0.52%	678,393	0.52%	685,718	0.50%
Tajiks	52	0.00%	3,315	0.00%	7,027	0.01%	14,108	0.01%	17,863	0.01%
Uzbeks	942	0.00%	16,166	0.01%	29,512	0.03%	61,588	0.05%	72,385	0.05%
Tuvans	200	0.00%	794	0.00%	99,864	0.08%	139,013	0.11%	165,426	0.12%
Crimean Tatars	0	0.00%	0	0.00%	416	0.00%	2,852	0.00%	5,165	0.00%
Karachays	55,116	0.06%	74,488	0.07%	70,537	0.06%	106,831	0.08%	125,792	0.09%
Belarusians	607,845	0.66%	451,933	0.42%	843,985	0.72%	964,082	0.74%	1,051,900	0.77%
Germans	707,277	0.76%	811,205	0.75%	820,016	0.70%	761,888	0.59%	790,762	0.58%
Kalmyks	128,809	0.14%	129,786	0.12%	100,603	0.09%	131,318	0.10%	140,103	0.10%
Laks	40,243	0.04%	54,348	0.05%	58,397	0.05%	78,625	0.06%	91,412	0.07%
Roma	39,089	0.04%	59,198	0.05%	72,488	0.06%	97,955	0.08%	120,672	0.09%
Tabasarans	31,983	0.03%	33,471	0.03%	34,288	0.03%	54,047	0.04%	73,433	0.05%
Komi (Note: (including Komi-Permyak in 1939))	226,012	0.24%	415,009	0.38%	281,780	0.24%	315,347	0.24%	320,078	0.23%
Kyrgyz	285	0.00%	6,311	0.01%	4,701	0.00%	9,107	0.01%	15,011	0.01%
Balkars	33,298	0.04%	41,949	0.04%	35,249	0.03%	52,969	0.04%	61,828	0.04%
Turks (Note: (including Meskhetian Turks from 1926–1989))	1,846	0.00%	2,668	0.00%	1,377	0.00%	1,568	0.00%	3,561	0.00%
Cherkess / Circassians (Note: (in the Adyghe group from 1926–1939))					28,986	0.02%	38,356	0.03%	44,572	0.03%
Georgians	20,551	0.02%	43,585	0.04%	57,594	0.05%	68,971	0.05%	89,407	0.07%
Adyghe (Note: (including Shapsugs 1926–1989 and Cherkess 1926–1939))	64,959	0.07%	85,588	0.08%	78,561	0.07%	98,461	0.08%	107,239	0.08%
Nogais	36,089	0.04%	36,088	0.03%	37,656	0.03%	51,159	0.04%	58,639	0.04%
Koreans	86,799	0.09%	11,345	0.01%	91,445	0.08%	101,369	0.08%	97,649	0.07%
Altay	52,248	0.06%	46,489	0.04%	44,654	0.04%	54,614	0.04%	58,879	0.04%
Jews	539,086	0.58%	891,147	0.82%	875,058	0.74%	807,526	0.62%	699,286	0.51%
Moldovans	16,870	0.02%	21,974	0.02%	62,298	0.05%	87,538	0.07%	102,137	0.07%
Khakas	45,607	0.05%	52,033	0.05%	56,032	0.05%	65,368	0.05%	69,247	0.05%
Komi-Permyak (Note: (in Komi in 1939 census))	149,275	0.16%			143,030	0.12%	150,244	0.12%	145,993	0.11%
Pontic Greeks (Note: (includes Caucasus Greeks))	34,439	0.04%	65,705	0.06%	47,024	0.04%	57,847	0.04%	69,816	0.05%
Nenets (Note: (including Enets, 1926–1979, and Nganasans, 1926–1939))	17,560	0.02%	24,716	0.02%	22,845	0.02%	28,487	0.02%	29,487	0.02%
Abazas	13,825	0.01%	14,739	0.01%	19,059	0.02%	24,892	0.02%	28,800	0.02%
Turkmens	7,849	0.01%	12,869	0.01%	11,631	0.01%	20,040	0.02%	22,979	0.02%
Evenks	38,804	0.03%	29,599	0.02%	24,583	0.02%	25,051	0.02%	27,278	0.02%
Aghuls	7,653	0.01%	SDP	SDP	6,460	0.01%	8,751	0.01%	11,752	0.01%
Rutuls	10,333	0.01%	SDP	SDP	6,703	0.01%	11,904	0.01%	14,835	0.01%
Karelians	248,017	0.27%	249,778	0.23%	164,050	0.14%	141,148	0.11%	133,182	0.10%
Khanty	22,301	0.02%	18,447	0.02%	19,246	0.02%	21,007	0.02%	20,743	0.02%
Yazidis	1	0.00%								
Kurds (Note: (including Yazidis 1939–1989))	164	0.00%	387	0.00%	855	0.00%	1,015	0.00%	1,634	0.00%
Poles	189,269	0.20%	142,461	0.13%	118,422	0.10%	107,084	0.08%	99,733	0.07%
Evens	2,044	0.00%	9,674	0.01%	9,023	0.01%	11,819	0.01%	12,215	0.01%
Chinese	8,739	0.01%	22,491	0.02%	19,097	0.02%	7,987	0.01%	5,743	0.00%
Arabs	466	0.00%	94	0.00%	649	0.00%	2,555	0.00%	2,339	0.00%
Chukchi (Note: (incl. Kereks 1926–1989 and Chuvans 1939–1979))	12,331	0.01%	13,830	0.01%	11,680	0.01%	13,500	0.01%	13,937	0.01%
Lithuanians	26,128	0.03%	20,795	0.02%	108,579	0.09%	76,718	0.06%	66,783	0.05%
Tsakhurs	3,533	0.00%	SDP	SDP	4,437	0.00%	4,730	0.00%	4,774	0.00%
Mansi	5,754	0.01%	6,295	0.01%	6,318	0.01%	7,609	0.01%	7,434	0.01%
Bulgarians	4,087	0.00%	8,338	0.01%	24,899	0.02%	27,321	0.02%	24,943	0.02%
Nanais	5,860	0.01%	8,411	0.01%	7,919	0.01%	9,911	0.01%	10,357	0.01%
Shors	13,000	0.01%	16,042	0.01%	14,938	0.01%	15,950	0.01%	15,182	0.01%
Gagauz	0	0.00%	0	0.00%	3,012	0.00%	3,704	0.00%	4,176	0.00%
Latvians	124,312	0.13%	104,877	0.10%	74,932	0.06%	59,695	0.05%	67,267	0.05%
Abkhaz	97	0.00%	647	0.00%	1,400	0.00%	2,427	0.00%	4,058	0.00%
Dolgans (Note: (in Yakuts 1939–1959))	656	0.00%					4,718	0.00%	4,911	0.00%
Finns	134,089	0.14%	138,962	0.13%	72,356	0.06%	62,307	0.05%	55,687	0.04%
Vietnamese	0	0.00%	0	0.00%	781	0.00%	6,287	0.00%	661	0.00%
Estonians	146,051	0.16%	130,494	0.12%	78,556	0.07%	62,980	0.05%	55,539	0.04%
Indians	17	0.00%	0	0.00%	216	0.00%	1,378	0.00%	181	0.00%
Koryaks	7,437	0.01%	7,337	0.01%	6,168	0.01%	7,367	0.01%	7,637	0.01%
Nağaybäk	11,196	0.01%	0	0.00%	0	0.00%	0	0.00%	0	0.00%
Veps	32,783	0.04%	31,442	0.03%	16,170	0.01%	8,057	0.01%	7,550	0.01%
Assyrians	2,791	0.00%	7,446	0.01%	7,612	0.01%	8,098	0.01%	8,708	0.01%
Soyots (Note: (in Buryats 1939–1989))	229	0.00%								
Meskhetian Turks (Note: (in Turks 1926–1989))										
Nivkh	4,076	0.00%	3,857	0.00%	3,690	0.00%	4,356	0.00%	4,366	0.00%
Talysh	0	0.00%	47	0.00%	33	0.00%			2	0.00%
Afghans	38	0.00%	190	0.00%	175	0.00%	561	0.00%	184	0.00%
Selkups	1,630	0.00%	2,604	0.00%	3,704	0.00%	4,249	0.00%	3,518	0.00%
Dungans	6,009	0.01%	48	0.00%	169	0.00%	304	0.00%	1,159	0.00%
Itelmeni	803	0.00%	SSP	SSP	1,096	0.00%	1,255	0.00%	1,335	0.00%
Udis	2	0.00%	SDP	SDP	35	0.00%	94	0.00%	216	0.00%
Ulchs	723	0.00%	SSP	SSP	2,049	0.00%	2,410	0.00%	2,494	0.00%
Persians	8,626	0.01%	6,041	0.01%	2,490	0.00%	2,548	0.00%	1,747	0.00%
Kumandins	6,335	0.01%	0	0.00%	0	0.00%	0	0.00%	0	0.00%
Teleuts	1,898	0.00%	0	0.00%	0	0.00%	0	0.00%	0	0.00%
Uygurs	26	0.00%	642	0.00%	720	0.00%	1,513	0.00%	1,707	0.00%
Serbs	1,278	0.00%	2,373	0.00%	0	0.00%	1,431	0.00%	815	0.00%
Hemshins	2	0.00%	0	0.00%	0	0.00%	0	0.00%	0	0.00%
Besermyan (Note: (in Udmurts 1939–1989))	10,035	0.01%								
Shapsugs (Note: (in Adyghe 1926–1989))										
Romanians	2,881	0.00%	2,682	0.00%	3,316	0.00%	4,093	0.00%	3,837	0.00%
Yukaghir	443	0.00%	SSP	SSP	440	0.00%	593	0.00%	801	0.00%
Inuit /Yupik	1,292	0.00%	SSP	SSP	1,111	0.00%	1,265	0.00%	1,460	0.00%
Kamchadals	4,216	0.00%	0	0.00%	0	0.00%	0	0.00%	0	0.00%
Sami	1,715	0.00%	1,828	0.00%	1,760	0.00%	1,836	0.00%	1,775	0.00%
Hungarians	3,882	0.00%	0	0.00%	4,175	0.00%	6,681	0.01%	4,313	0.00%
Italians	749	0.00%	713	0.00%	525	0.00%	889	0.00%	356	0.00%
French	1,338	0.00%	991	0.00%	535	0.00%	1,243	0.00%	305	0.00%
Udege (Note: (including Taz 1926–1989))	1,357	0.00%	1,701	0.00%	1,395	0.00%	1,396	0.00%	1,431	0.00%
Mongols	548	0.00%	0	0.00%	1,511	0.00%	3,759	0.00%	1,812	0.00%
Czechs	7,996	0.01%	7,526	0.01%	7,174	0.01%	6,073	0.00%	4,491	0.00%
Spanish	0	0.00%	2,290	0.00%	1,615	0.00%	2,631	0.00%	1,961	0.00%
British	517	0.00%	416	0.00%	312	0.00%	542	0.00%	115	0.00%
Americans	0	0.00%	457	0.00%	273	0.00%	785	0.00%	81	0.00%
Ket	1,428	0.00%	SSP	SSP	1,017	0.00%	1,161	0.00%	1,072	0.00%
Krymchaks	6,185	0.01%	0	0.00%	249	0.00%	389	0.00%	1,365	0.00%
Chuvans (Note: (in Chukchi 1939–1979))	704	0.00%	1,384	0.00%						
Karakalpaks	14	0.00%	306	0.00%	988	0.00%	2,267	0.00%	1,743	0.00%
Izhorians	16,136	0.02%	7,720	0.01%	564	0.00%	561	0.00%	449	0.00%
Tofalar	2,828	0.00%	SSP	SSP	476	0.00%	570	0.00%	576	0.00%
Cubans	0	0.00%	0	0.00%	0	0.00%	0	0.00%	1,175	0.00%
Nganasans (Note: (in Nenets 1926–1939))					721	0.00%	823	0.00%	842	0.00%
Japanese	79	0.00%	922	0.00%	888	0.00%	1,141	0.00%	655	0.00%
Ruthenians	0	0.00%	0	0.00%	0	0.00%	0	0.00%	0	0.00%
Tats	223	0.00%			5,136	0.00%	8,753	0.01%	12,748	0.01%
Orochs (Note: (incl. Oroks 1970–1979))	646	0.00%	SSP	SSP	779	0.00%	1,037	0.00%	1,040	0.00%
Karaites	1,608	0.00%			1,608	0.00%	1,236	0.00%	939	0.00%
Negidals	683	0.00%	SSP	SSP			495	0.00%	477	0.00%
Pamiris	0	0.00%	0	0.00%	0	0.00%	0	0.00%	0	0.00%
Pakistani	0	0.00%	0	0.00%	0	0.00%	0	0.00%	0	0.00%
Aleut	353	0.00%	SSP	SSP	399	0.00%	410	0.00%	489	0.00%
Chulyms	0	0.00%	0	0.00%	0	0.00%	0	0.00%	0	0.00%
Oroks (Note: (in Orochs 1970–1979))	162	0.00%	SSP	SSP	2	0.00%				
Mountain Jews	15,612	0.02%	0	0.00%	19,352	0.02%	15,434	0.01%	6,509	0.00%
Taz (Note: (in Udege 1926–1989))										
Enets (Note: (in Nenets 1926–1979))										
Slovaks	0	0.00%	513	0.00%	497	0.00%	758	0.00%	439	0.00%
Croats	0	0.00%	0	0.00%	0	0.00%	174	0.00%	115	0.00%
Macedonians	0	0.00%	0	0.00%	0	0.00%	0	0.00%	0	0.00%
Slovenes	0	0.00%	0	0.00%	0	0.00%	0	0.00%	0	0.00%
Votes	705	0.00%	0	0.00%	0	0.00%	0	0.00%	0	0.00%
Bosnians	0	0.00%	0	0.00%	0	0.00%	0	0.00%	0	0.00%
Montenegrins	0	0.00%	0	0.00%	0	0.00%	0	0.00%	0	0.00%
Kereks (Note: (in Chukchi 1926–1989))										
Central Asian Jews	93	0.00%	0	0.00%	99	0.00%	91	0.00%	336	0.00%
Georgian Jews	82	0.00%	0	0.00%	109	0.00%	109	0.00%	130	0.00%
Central Asian Roma	0	0.00%	0	0.00%	0	0.00%	0	0.00%	0	0.00%
Small Dagestan Peoples (SDP)			20,962	0.02%						
Small Siberian Peoples (SSP)			11,824	0.01%						
Other Ethnicity										
Ethnicity not stated or stated No ethnicity										

=== 1989–2021 ===
Population counts and percentage from the 1989, 2002, 2010, and 2021 censuses
Ethnic group	Year								
Ethnic group	1989 Census		2002 Census		2010 Census		2021 Census		
Ethnic group	Number	%	Number	%	Number	%	Number	%	% (of those declared)
Russians	119,865,469	81.5%	115,889,107	79.83%	111,016,896	77.71%	105,579,179	71.76%	80.85%
Tatars	5,522,096	3.8%	5,554,601	3.83%	5,310,649	3.72%	4,713,669	3.20%	3.61%
Chechens	898,999	0.61%	1,360,253	0.95%	1,431,360	1.00%	1,674,854	1.14%	1.28%
Bashkir	1,345,273	0.92%	1,673,389	1.16%	1,584,554	1.11%	1,571,879	1.07%	1.20%
Chuvashs	1,773,645	1.21%	1,637,094	1.14%	1,435,872	1.01%	1,067,139	0.73%	0.82%
Avars	544,016	0.37%	814,473	0.57%	912,090	0.64%	1,012,074	0.69%	0.78%
Armenians	532,390	0.36%	1,132,033	0.79%	1,182,388	0.83%	946,172	0.64%	0.72%
Ukrainians	4,362,872	3.0%	2,942,961	2.03%	1,927,888	1.35%	884,007	0.6%	0.68%
Dargins	353,348	0.24%	510,156	0.35%	589,386	0.41%	626,601	0.43%	0.48%
Kazakhs	635,865	0.43%	653,962	0.46%	647,732	0.45%	591,970	0.40%	0.45%
Kumyks	277,163	0.19%	422,409	0.29%	503,060	0.35%	565,830	0.38%	0.43%
Kabardins	386,055	0.26%	519,958	0.36%	516,826	0.36%	523,404	0.36%	0.40%
Ingush	215,068	0.15%	413,016	0.29%	444,833	0.31%	517,186	0.35%	0.40%
Lezgins	257,270	0.17%	411,535	0.28%	473,722	0.33%	488,608	0.33%	0.37%
Ossetians	402,275	0.27%	514,875	0.36%	528,515	0.37%	485,646	0.33%	0.37%
Mordvins	1,072,939	0.73%	843,350	0.59%	744,237	0.52%	484,450	0.33%	0.37%
Yakuts	380,242	0.26%	443,852	0.31%	478,085	0.34%	478,409	0.33%	0.37%
Azerbaijanis	335,889	0.23%	621,840	0.43%	603,070	0.42%	474,576	0.32%	0.36%
Buryats	417,425	0.28%	445,175	0.31%	461,389	0.32%	460,053	0.31%	0.35%
Mari	643,698	0.44%	604,298	0.42%	547,605	0.38%	423,803	0.29%	0.32%
Udmurts	714,883	0.49%	636,906	0.44%	552,299	0.39%	386,465	0.26%	0.30%
Tajiks	38,208	0.03%	120,136	0.08%	200,666	0.14%	350,236	0.24%	0.27%
Uzbeks	126,899	0.09%	122,916	0.09%	289,862	0.20%	323,278	0.22%	0.25%
Tuvans	206,160	0.14%	243,442	0.17%	263,934	0.19%	295,384	0.20%	0.23%
Crimean Tatars	21,275	0.01%	4,131		2,449		257,592	0.18%	0.20%
Karachays	150,332	0.10%	192,182	0.13%	218,403	0.15%	226,271	0.15%	0.17%
Belarusians	1,206,222	0.82%	807,970	0.56%	521,443	0.37%	208,046	0.14%	0.16%
Germans	842,295	0.57%	597,212	0.41%	394,138	0.28%	195,256	0.13%	0.15%
Kalmyks	165,103	0.11%	174,000	0.12%	183,372	0.13%	179,547	0.12%	0.14%
Laks	106,245	0.07%	156,545	0.11%	178,630	0.13%	173,416	0.12%	0.13%
Roma	152,939	0.10%	183,252	0.13%	204,958	0.14%	173,400	0.12%	0.13%
Tabasarans	93,587	0.06%	131,785	0.09%	146,360	0.10%	151,466	0.10%	0.12%
Komi	336,309	0.23%	293,406	0.20%	228,235	0.16%	148,516	0.10%	0.11%
Kyrgyz	41,734	0.03%	31,808	0.02%	103,422	0.07%	137,780	0.09%	0.11%
Balkars	78,341	0.05%	108,426	0.08%	112,924	0.08%	125,044	0.08%	0.10%
Turks	9,890	0.01%	92,415	0.06%	105,058	0.07%	116,705	0.08%	0.09%
Cherkess / Circassians	50,572	0.03%	60,517		73,184		114,697	0.08%	0.09%
Georgians	130,688	0.09%	197,934	0.14%	157,803	0.11%	112,765	0.08%	0.09%
Adyghe	122,908	0.08%	128,528	0.09%	124,835	0.09%	111,471	0.08%	0.09%
Nogais	73,703	0.05%	90,666	0.06%	103,660	0.07%	109,042	0.07%	0.08%
Koreans	107,051	0.07%	148,556	0.10%	153,156	0.11%	87,819	0.06%	0.07%
Altay	69,409	0.05%	77,822	0.05%	89,773	0.05%	83,125	0.06%	0.06%
Jews	550,709	0.37%	233,439	0.16%	156,801	0.11%	82,644	0.06%	0.06%
Moldovans	172,671	0.12%	172,330	0.12%	156,400	0.11%	77,509	0.05%	0.06%
Khakas	78,500	0.05%	76,278		72,959		61,365	0.04%	0.04%
Komi-Permyak	147,269	0.10%	125,235	0.09%	94,456	0.07%	55,786	0.04%	0.04%
Greeks	91,699	0.06%	97,827	0.07%	85,640	0.06%	53,972	0.04%	0.04%
Nenets	34,190	0.02%	41,302		44,640		49,646	0.03%	0.04%
Abazas	32,983	0.02%	37,942		43,341		41,793	0.03%	0.03%
Turkmens	39,739	0.03%	33,053		36,885		41,328	0.03%	0.03%
Evenks	29,901	0.02%	35,527		37,843		39,226	0.03%	0.03%
Aghuls	17,728	0.01%	28,297		34,160		34,576	0.02%	0.03%
Rutuls	19,503	0.01%	29,929		35,240		34,259	0.02%	0.03%
Karelians	124,921	0.08%	93,344		60,815		32,422	0.02%	0.02%
Khanty	22,283	0.02%	28,678		30,943		31,467	0.02%	0.02%
Yazidis			31,273		40,586		26,257	0.02%	0.02%
Kurds	4,724	0.00%	19,607		23,232		24,657	0.01%	0.02%
Poles	94,594	0.06%	73,001		47,125		22,024	0.01%	0.02%
Evens	17,055	0.01%	19,071		22,383		19,913	0.01%	0.02%
Chinese	5,197	0.00%	34,577		28,943		19,644	0.01%	0.02%
Arabs	2,704	0.00%	10,811		9,583		16,329	0.01%	0.01%
Chukchi	15,107	0.01%	15,767		15,908		16,200	0.01%	0.01%
Lithuanians	70,427	0.05%	45,569		31,377		13,230	0.01%	0.01%
Tsakhurs	6,492	0.00%	10,366		12,769		12,541	0.01%	0.01%
Mansi	8,279	0.01%	11,432		12,269		12,228	0.01%	0.01%
Bulgarians	32,785	0.02%	31,965		24,038		11,851	0.01%	0.01%
Nanais	11,883	0.01%	12,160		12,003		11,623	0.01%	0.01%
Shors	15,745	0.01%	13,975		12,888		10,507	0.01%	0.01%
Gagauz	10,051	0.01%	12,210		13,690		9,272	0.01%	0.01%
Latvians	46,829	0.03%	28,520		18,979		8,516	0.01%	0.01%
Abkhaz	7,239	0.00%	11,366		11,249		8,177	0.01%	0.01%
Dolgans	6,584	0.00%	7,261		7,885		8,157	0.01%	0.01%
Finns	47,102	0.03%	34,050		20,267		7,978	0.01%	0.01%
Vietnamese	2,142	0.00%	26,206		13,954		7,859	0.01%	0.01%
Estonians	46,390	0.03%	28,113		17,875		7,778	0.01%	0.01%
Indians	535	0.00%	4,980		4,058		7,667	0.01%	0.01%
Koryaks	8,942	0.01%	8,743		7,953		7,485	0.01%	0.01%
Nağaybäk	0	0.00%	9,600		8,148		5,719	0.00%	0.00%
Veps	12,142	0.01%	8,240		5,936		4,534	0.00%	0.00%
Assyrians	9,622	0.01%	13,649		11,084		4,421	0.00%	0.00%
Soyots			2,769		3,608		4,368	0.00%	0.00%
Meskhetian Turks			3,527		4,825		4,095	0.00%	0.00%
Nivkh	4,631	0.00%	5,162		4,652		3,842	0.00%	0.00%
Talysh	202	0.00%	2,548		2,529		3,595	0.00%	0.00%
Afghans	858	0.00%	9,800		5,350		3,536	0.00%	0.00%
Selkups	3,564	0.00%	4,249		3,649		3,458	0.00%	0.00%
Dungans	635	0.00%	801		1,651		3,028	0.00%	0.00%
Itelmeni	2,429	0.00%	3,180		3,193		2,596	0.00%	0.00%
Udis	1,102	0.00%	3,721		4,267		2,551	0.00%	0.00%
Ulchs	3,173	0.00%	2,913		2,765		2,472	0.00%	0.00%
Persians	2,572	0.00%	3,821		3,696		2,434	0.00%	0.00%
Kumandins	0	0.00%	3,114		2,892		2,408	0.00%	0.00%
Teleuts	0	0.00%	2,650		2,643		2,217	0.00%	0.00%
Uygurs	2,577	0.00%	2,867		3,696		2,217	0.00%	0.00%
Serbs	1,580	0.00%	4,156		3,510		2,151	0.00%	0.00%
Hemshins	0	0.00%	1,542		2,047		2,082	0.00%	0.00%
Besermyan			3,122		2,201		2,036	0.00%	0.00%
Shapsugs			3,231		3,882		1,914	0.00%	0.00%
Romanians	5,996	0.00%	5,308		3,201		1,850	0.00%	0.00%
Yukaghir	1,112	0.00%	1,509		1,603		1,802	0.00%	0.00%
Inuit /Yupik	1,704	0.00%	1,750		1,738		1,657	0.00%	0.00%
Kamchadals	0	0.00%	2,293		1,927		1,547	0.00%	0.00%
Sami	1,835	0.00%	1,991		1,771		1,530	0.00%	0.00%
Hungarians	5,742	0.00%	3,768		2,781		1,460	0.00%	0.00%
Italians	627	0.00%	862		1,370		1,460	0.00%	0.00%
French	352	0.00%	819		1,475		1,457	0.00%	0.00%
Udege	1,902	0.00%	1,657		1,496		1,325	0.00%	0.00%
Mongols	2,117	0.00%	2,656		2,986		1,318	0.00%	0.00%
Czechs	4,375	0.00%	2,904		1,898		1,214	0.00%	0.00%
Spanish	2,054	0.00%	1,547		1,162		1,175	0.00%	0.00%
British	223	0.00%	529		950		1,167	0.00%	0.00%
Americans	185	0.00%	1,275		1,572		1,129	0.00%	0.00%
Ket	1,084	0.00%	1,494		1,219		1,088	0.00%	0.00%
Krymchaks	338	0.00%	157		90		954	0.00%	0.00%
Chuvans			1,087		1,002		900	0.00%	0.00%
Karakalpaks	6,155	0.00%	1,609		1,466		838	0.00%	0.00%
Izhorians	449	0.00%	327		266		781	0.00%	0.00%
Tofalar	722	0.00%	837		762		719	0.00%	0.00%
Cubans	1,566	0.00%	707		676		701	0.00%	0.00%
Nganasans	1,262	0.00%	834		862		687	0.00%	0.00%
Japanese	591	0.00%	835		888		663	0.00%	0.00%
Rusyns	0	0.00%	97		225		596	0.00%	0.00%
Tats	19,420	0.01%	2,303		1,585		575	0.00%	0.00%
Orochs	883	0.00%	686		596		527	0.00%	0.00%
Karaites	680	0.00%	366		205		500	0.00%	0.00%
Negidals	587	0.00%	567		513		481	0.00%	0.00%
Pamiris	0	0.00%	0		363		467	0.00%	0.00%
Pakistani	0	0.00%	0		507		410	0.00%	0.00%
Aleut	644	0.00%	540		482		397	0.00%	0.00%
Chulyms	0	0.00%	656		355		382	0.00%	0.00%
Oroks	179	0.00%	346		295		268	0.00%	0.00%
Mountain Jews	11,282	0.01%	3,394		762		266	0.00%	0.00%
Taz			276		274		235	0.00%	0.00%
Enets	198	0.00%	237		227		201	0.00%	0.00%
Slovaks	711	0.00%	568		324		193	0.00%	0.00%
Swedes			295						
Croats	479	0.00%	0		304		177	0.00%	0.00%
Macedonians	0	0.00%	0		325		155	0.00%	0.00%
Slovenes	0	0.00%	0		1,008		108	0.00%	0.00%
Votes	0	0.00%	73		64		99	0.00%	0.00%
Bosnians	0	0.00%	0		256		98	0.00%	0.00%
Montenegrins	0	0.00%	0		181		85	0.00%	0.00%
Kereks			8		4		23	0.00%	0.00%
Central Asian Jews	1,407	0.00%	54		32		18	0.00%	0.00%
Georgian Jews	1,172	0.00%	53		78		14	0.00%	0.00%
Central Asian Roma	0	0.00%	486		49		12	0.00%	0.00%
Small Dagestan Peoples (SDP)									
Small Siberian Peoples (SSP)									
Other Ethnicity							1,393,685	0.95%	1.08%
Ethnicity not stated or no ethnicity							17,136,960	11.64%	-

== Population pyramids ==
Population counts by ethnicity and age group from the 2021 census
Age group
Ethnic group	0–4		5–9		10–14		15–19		20–24		25–29		30–34		35–39		40–44		45–49		50–54		55–59		60–64		65–69		70+	
Ethnic group	Number	%	Number	%	Number	%	Number	%	Number	%	Number	%	Number	%	Number	%	Number	%	Number	%	Number	%	Number	%	Number	%	Number	%	Number	%
Russians	4,334,440	66.95%	5,966,414	69.29%	5,766,326	70.66%	5,340,856	70.62%	5,163,351	66.62%	5,393,223	67.55%	8,481,120	69.76%	9,335,477	71.57%	8,472,945	72.70%	7,632,642	73.29%	6,593,254	71.59%	6,891,790	71.26%	7,865,167	73.86%	6,870,922	76.14%	11,471,252	77.42%
Tatars	221,306	3.42%	286,857	3.33%	245,636	3.01%	217,507	2.88%	215,309	2.78%	254,529	3.19%	404,180	3.32%	399,251	3.06%	327,508	2.81%	296,757	2.85%	300,216	3.26%	373,807	3.87%	407,059	3.82%	303,666	3.36%	460,081	3.10%
Chechens	141,571	2.19%	166,434	1.93%	179,695	2.20%	154,367	2.04%	141,881	1.83%	122,198	1.53%	141,250	1.16%	119,901	0.92%	104,782	0.90%	82,218	0.79%	77,825	0.85%	76,499	0.79%	73,573	0.69%	47,395	0.53%	45,265	0.31%
Avars	83,445	1.29%	103,670	1.20%	89,829	1.10%	77,786	1.03%	81,618	1.05%	77,174	0.97%	88,924	0.73%	75,562	0.58%	67,172	0.58%	57,701	0.55%	55,431	0.60%	50,272	0.52%	41,337	0.39%	25,173	0.28%	36,980	0.25%
Bashkir	70,626	1.09%	99,343	1.15%	97,930	1.20%	86,525	1.14%	80,847	1.04%	86,742	1.09%	132,296	1.09%	131,361	1.01%	109,473	0.94%	96,554	0.93%	103,242	1.12%	125,251	1.30%	130,332	1.22%	91,898	1.02%	129,459	0.87%
Dargins	45,532	0.70%	57,093	0.66%	53,104	0.65%	47,026	0.62%	48,964	0.63%	48,790	0.61%	56,351	0.46%	49,513	0.38%	43,497	0.37%	37,414	0.36%	36,439	0.40%	33,689	0.35%	27,661	0.26%	16,913	0.19%	24,615	0.17%
Kumyks	45,173	0.70%	56,245	0.65%	51,163	0.63%	42,737	0.57%	45,907	0.59%	43,566	0.55%	51,716	0.43%	44,966	0.34%	37,730	0.32%	30,413	0.29%	28,709	0.31%	27,540	0.28%	24,690	0.23%	15,679	0.17%	19,596	0.13%
Armenians	43,764	0.68%	57,809	0.67%	52,862	0.65%	48,218	0.64%	51,680	0.67%	62,878	0.79%	88,644	0.73%	88,517	0.68%	79,230	0.68%	67,191	0.65%	64,342	0.70%	68,383	0.71%	68,180	0.64%	46,049	0.51%	58,425	0.39%
Chuvashs	40,458	0.62%	54,583	0.63%	51,501	0.63%	44,815	0.59%	43,377	0.56%	50,055	0.63%	77,606	0.64%	77,827	0.60%	73,430	0.63%	76,611	0.74%	81,851	0.89%	99,099	1.02%	102,345	0.96%	75,457	0.84%	118,124	0.80%
Yakuts	34,972	0.54%	43,120	0.50%	40,171	0.49%	36,408	0.48%	34,334	0.44%	35,642	0.45%	40,455	0.33%	36,844	0.28%	27,792	0.24%	24,658	0.24%	25,346	0.28%	28,425	0.29%	27,541	0.26%	19,601	0.22%	23,100	0.16%
Kabardins	32,120	0.50%	42,908	0.50%	39,524	0.48%	31,423	0.42%	35,937	0.46%	38,458	0.48%	49,580	0.41%	43,154	0.33%	36,768	0.32%	30,297	0.29%	32,664	0.35%	33,593	0.35%	29,456	0.28%	19,109	0.21%	28,413	0.19%
Buryats	31,885	0.49%	41,558	0.48%	39,154	0.48%	29,549	0.39%	23924	0.31%	25,751	0.32%	40,400	0.33%	40,549	0.31%	33,403	0.29%	27,637	0.27%	24,436	0.27%	27,308	0.28%	28,477	0.27%	20,579	0.23%	25,443	0.17%
Kazakhs	31,801	0.49%	42,610	0.49%	39,874	0.49%	33,420	0.44%	31,844	0.41%	38,082	0.48%	52,140	0.43%	48,471	0.37%	41,974	0.36%	40,002	0.38%	42,707	0.46%	47,780	0.49%	43,116	0.40%	27,115	0.30%	31,034	0.21%
Ingush	31,325	0.48%	41,185	0.48%	46,994	0.58%	48,328	0.64%	55,848	0.72%	48,673	0.61%	46,649	0.38%	36,553	0.28%	33,817	0.29%	28,321	0.27%	30,270	0.33%	23,819	0.25%	20,580	0.19%	11,215	0.12%	13,609	0.09%
Lezgins	31,087	0.48%	40,734	0.47%	37,915	0.46%	33,304	0.44%	40,083	0.52%	38,964	0.49%	46,489	0.38%	40,836	0.31%	35,464	0.30%	30,092	0.29%	29,010	0.32%	27,091	0.28%	24,208	0.23%	14,987	0.17%	18,344	0.12%
Tuvans	28,387	0.44%	32,859	0.38%	32,715	0.40%	23,088	0.31%	18,971	0.24%	22,751	0.28%	27,090	0.22%	23,469	0.18%	18,550	0.16%	16,451	0.16%	15,435	0.17%	13,166	0.14%	9,633	0.09%	5,411	0.06%	7,408	0.05%
Tajiks	28,221	0.44%	30,185	0.35%	24,263	0.30%	22,342	0.30%	34,505	0.45%	35,084	0.44%	40,534	0.33%	36,651	0.28%	28,665	0.25%	22,395	0.22%	17,471	0.19%	12,363	0.13%	8,521	0.08%	4,706	0.05%	4,330	0.03%
Azerbaijanis	27,487	0.42%	34,363	0.40%	32,401	0.40%	29,957	0.40%	32,046	0.41%	38,659	0.48%	42,837	0.35%	38,404	0.29%	34,802	0.30%	33,197	0.32%	37,996	0.41%	36,326	0.38%	27,551	0.26%	14,551	0.16%	13,999	0.09%
Ossetians	21,746	0.34%	29,973	0.35%	30,101	0.37%	27,739	0.37%	31,282	0.40%	32,377	0.41%	41,529	0.34%	38,100	0.29%	35,347	0.30%	33,233	0.32%	32,104	0.35%	32,563	0.34%	31,127	0.29%	22,907	0.25%	45,518	0.31%
Crimean Tatars	19,234	0.30%	22,616	0.26%	20,398	0.25%	13,753	0.18%	12,485	0.16%	15,271	0.19%	22,394	0.18%	22,580	0.17%	16,913	0.15%	13,337	0.13%	13,200	0.14%	17,028	0.18%	19,051	0.18%	14,582	0.16%	14,750	0.10%
Roma	18,595	0.29%	23,226	0.27%	20,384	0.25%	14,701	0.19%	12,271	0.16%	12,641	0.16%	14,624	0.12%	12,684	0.10%	10,896	0.09%	8,334	0.08%	7,058	0.08%	5,946	0.06%	5,328	0.05%	3,548	0.04%	3,164	0.02%
Uzbeks	17,600	0.27%	19,037	0.22%	15,786	0.19%	15,857	0.21%	30,431	0.39%	33,735	0.42%	39,730	0.33%	36,994	0.28%	30,357	0.26%	24,526	0.24%	20,007	0.22%	14,587	0.15%	10,795	0.10%	6,740	0.07%	7,096	0.05%
Mari	15,709	0.24%	22,831	0.27%	22,160	0.27%	19,497	0.26%	17,914	0.23%	21,288	0.27%	33,746	0.28%	34,745	0.27%	31,027	0.27%	28,872	0.28%	30,716	0.33%	38,175	0.39%	42,304	0.40%	30,219	0.33%	34,600	0.23%
Karachays	14,307	0.22%	17,737	0.21%	17,633	0.22%	14,969	0.20%	14,574	0.19%	16,208	0.20%	20,194	0.17%	18,705	0.14%	16,042	0.14%	13,444	0.13%	13,665	0.15%	13,860	0.14%	13,606	0.13%	9,252	0.10%	12,075	0.08%
Udmurts	11,344	0.18%	17,027	0.20%	17,745	0.22%	15,435	0.20%	14,308	0.18%	15,868	0.20%	25,665	0.21%	28,524	0.22%	27,046	0.23%	26,996	0.26%	28,094	0.31%	37,708	0.39%	44,425	0.42%	33,115	0.37%	43,165	0.29%
Kyrgyz	11,096	0.17%	12,909	0.15%	9,961	0.12%	8,336	0.11%	12,396	0.16%	13,407	0.17%	15,706	0.13%	15,644	0.12%	11,943	0.10%	9,222	0.09%	6,899	0.07%	4,595	0.05%	2,847	0.03%	1,431	0.02%	1,388	0.01%
Tabasarans	10,920	0.17%	14,327	0.17%	14,041	0.17%	11,492	0.15%	11,622	0.15%	11,780	0.15%	13,166	0.11%	12,103	0.09%	11,088	0.10%	8,987	0.09%	8,453	0.09%	7,414	0.08%	6,519	0.06%	4,042	0.04%	5,512	0.04%
Kalmyks	10,733	0.17%	14,055	0.16%	13,558	0.17%	10,637	0.14%	9,207	0.12%	10,963	0.14%	16,771	0.14%	16,410	0.13%	12,597	0.11%	9,179	0.09%	9,545	0.10%	13,526	0.14%	13,867	0.13%	9,885	0.11%	8,614	0.06%
Mordvins	10,132	0.16%	13,993	0.16%	14,848	0.18%	14,853	0.20%	16,814	0.22%	20,171	0.25%	31,169	0.26%	32,568	0.25%	31,101	0.27%	33,561	0.32%	39,356	0.43%	50,171	0.52%	58,211	0.55%	45,562	0.50%	71,940	0.49%
Laks	9,905	0.15%	13,111	0.15%	12,973	0.16%	12,575	0.17%	15,903	0.21%	13,440	0.17%	16,251	0.13%	14,083	0.11%	12,758	0.11%	10,697	0.10%	10,390	0.11%	9,175	0.09%	7,994	0.08%	5,437	0.06%	8,724	0.06%
Turks	9,810	0.15%	12,127	0.14%	11,032	0.14%	8,705	0.12%	8,511	0.11%	9,355	0.12%	10,716	0.09%	9,781	0.07%	7,897	0.07%	6,398	0.06%	6,488	0.07%	6,202	0.06%	4,953	0.05%	2,698	0.03%	2,032	0.01%
Nogais	8,787	0.14%	10,920	0.13%	9,669	0.12%	6,660	0.09%	6,038	0.08%	7,033	0.09%	9,589	0.08%	8,718	0.07%	7,052	0.06%	5,894	0.06%	5,873	0.06%	7,042	0.07%	6,666	0.06%	4,583	0.05%	4,518	0.03%
Balkars	7,737	0.12%	9,724	0.11%	9,247	0.11%	7,283	0.10%	8,368	0.11%	9,080	0.11%	11,105	0.09%	10,395	0.08%	8,944	0.08%	7,282	0.07%	7,767	0.08%	8,133	0.08%	7,641	0.07%	5,200	0.06%	7,138	0.05%
Ukrainians	7,576	0.12%	13,586	0.16%	17,584	0.22%	17,447	0.23%	20,254	0.26%	26,615	0.33%	41,482	0.34%	50,223	0.39%	58,083	0.50%	72,191	0.69%	83,135	0.90%	96,872	1.00%	105,861	0.99%	90,064	1.00%	183,034	1.24%
Cherkess / Circassians	7,153	0.11%	8,720	0.10%	8,025	0.10%	6,835	0.09%	7,364	0.10%	8,124	0.10%	10,362	0.09%	9,588	0.07%	8,196	0.07%	6,830	0.07%	7,009	0.08%	7,433	0.08%	7,168	0.07%	4,749	0.05%	7,141	0.05%
Altay	6,023	0.09%	8,013	0.09%	7,771	0.10%	5,483	0.07%	4,211	0.05%	4,612	0.06%	6,752	0.06%	6,437	0.05%	5,038	0.04%	4,396	0.04%	3,940	0.04%	4,396	0.05%	4,678	0.04%	3,218	0.04%	3,157	0.02%
Adyghe	5,589	0.09%	7,514	0.09%	7,373	0.09%	6,059	0.08%	6,018	0.08%	7,062	0.09%	9,299	0.08%	9,021	0.07%	7,744	0.07%	7,189	0.07%	7,103	0.08%	8,077	0.08%	8,384	0.08%	5,780	0.06%	9,259	0.06%
Nenets	5,361	0.08%	5,943	0.07%	5,487	0.07%	4,213	0.06%	3,680	0.05%	3,979	0.05%	4,366	0.04%	3,417	0.03%	2,635	0.02%	2,328	0.02%	2,160	0.02%	2,148	0.02%	1,764	0.02%	1,173	0.01%	1,133	0.01%
Komi	4,339	0.07%	6,131	0.07%	6,091	0.07%	4,810	0.06%	4,014	0.05%	5,417	0.07%	8,900	0.07%	10,945	0.08%	10,460	0.09%	10,372	0.10%	10,836	0.12%	14,750	0.15%	16,817	0.16%	12,486	0.14%	17,148	0.12%
Germans	4,246	0.07%	5,824	0.07%	6,266	0.08%	6,420	0.08%	5,721	0.07%	5,609	0.07%	9,629	0.08%	13,377	0.10%	17,492	0.15%	15,629	0.15%	12,478	0.14%	16,757	0.17%	22,817	0.21%	23,414	0.26%	29,577	0.20%
Khakas	3,637	0.06%	5,329	0.06%	5,125	0.06%	4,019	0.05%	3,339	0.04%	3,754	0.05%	5,575	0.05%	5,234	0.04%	4,447	0.04%	3,744	0.04%	3,390	0.04%	3,715	0.04%	3,968	0.04%	2,917	0.03%	3,172	0.02%
Evenks	3,595	0.06%	4,342	0.05%	3,966	0.05%	3,066	0.04%	2,644	0.03%	3,019	0.04%	3,526	0.03%	2,946	0.02%	2,361	0.02%	2,149	0.02%	1,927	0.02%	1,993	0.02%	1,608	0.02%	1,084	0.01%	1,194	0.01%
Georgians	3,223	0.05%	4,123	0.05%	3,927	0.05%	4,401	0.06%	5,709	0.07%	6,754	0.08%	9,032	0.07%	8,820	0.07%	8,485	0.07%	8,998	0.09%	10,369	0.11%	10,992	0.11%	10,182	0.10%	7,325	0.08%	10,425	0.07%
Khanty	3,108	0.05%	3,758	0.04%	3,267	0.04%	2,527	0.03%	2,083	0.03%	2,235	0.03%	2,836	0.02%	2,330	0.02%	1,873	0.02%	1,693	0.02%	1,583	0.02%	1,524	0.02%	1,263	0.01%	755	0.01%	765	0.01%
Koreans	2,579	0.04%	3,857	0.04%	4,245	0.05%	4,195	0.06%	4,386	0.06%	4,201	0.05%	6,124	0.05%	7,284	0.06%	7,527	0.06%	6,912	0.07%	5,636	0.06%	5,671	0.06%	7,535	0.07%	7,752	0.09%	9,915	0.07%
Abazas	2,548	0.04%	3,282	0.04%	2,867	0.04%	2,392	0.03%	2,387	0.03%	2,812	0.04%	3,943	0.03%	3,724	0.03%	2,918	0.03%	2,355	0.02%	2,463	0.03%	2,686	0.03%	2,799	0.03%	1,959	0.02%	2,739	0.02%
Aghuls	2,370	0.04%	2,984	0.03%	2,691	0.03%	2,307	0.03%	2,998	0.04%	2,879	0.04%	3,272	0.03%	2,780	0.02%	2,568	0.02%	2,120	0.02%	2,059	0.02%	1,842	0.02%	1,526	0.01%	1,012	0.01%	1,168	0.01%
Rutuls	2,345	0.04%	3,112	0.04%	2,959	0.04%	2,361	0.03%	2,636	0.03%	2,888	0.04%	3,215	0.03%	2,780	0.02%	2,406	0.02%	2,115	0.02%	1,992	0.02%	1,914	0.02%	1,495	0.01%	886	0.01%	1,155	0.01%
Turkmens	1,960	0.03%	2,212	0.03%	1,971	0.02%	2,230	0.03%	8,866	0.11%	4,276	0.05%	3,167	0.03%	2,682	0.02%	2,256	0.02%	2,187	0.02%	2,315	0.03%	2,463	0.03%	2,010	0.02%	1,308	0.01%	1,435	0.01%
Pontic Greeks	1,820	0.03%	2,774	0.03%	2,789	0.03%	2,665	0.04%	2,608	0.03%	2,737	0.03%	4,108	0.03%	4,599	0.04%	4,283	0.04%	3,940	0.04%	3,477	0.04%	4,005	0.04%	4,454	0.04%	3,788	0.04%	5,925	0.04%
Evens	1,804	0.03%	2,194	0.03%	1,978	0.02%	1,608	0.02%	1,433	0.02%	1,462	0.02%	1,671	0.01%	1,520	0.01%	1,227	0.01%	1,127	0.01%	1,032	0.01%	878	0.01%	808	0.01%	565	0.01%	668	0.00%
Jews	1,746	0.03%	2,281	0.03%	2,294	0.03%	2,844	0.04%	3,477	0.04%	3,295	0.04%	4,612	0.04%	5,074	0.04%	5,287	0.05%	5,550	0.05%	5,624	0.06%	5,546	0.06%	6,470	0.06%	6,911	0.08%	21,633	0.15%
Belarusians	1,520	0.02%	2,275	0.03%	2,410	0.03%	3,009	0.04%	3,984	0.05%	5,166	0.06%	8,822	0.07%	10,403	0.08%	12,162	0.10%	14,953	0.14%	19,127	0.21%	24,782	0.26%	28,141	0.26%	22,391	0.25%	48,901	0.33%
Moldovans	1,413	0.02%	1,966	0.02%	2,196	0.03%	2,448	0.03%	3,184	0.04%	4,080	0.05%	6,242	0.05%	7,567	0.06%	7,805	0.07%	7,990	0.08%	7,545	0.08%	7,899	0.08%	4,725	0.04%	4,725	0.05%	4,878	0.03%
Komi-Permyak	1,353	0.02%	1,913	0.02%	2,208	0.03%	2,071	0.03%	1,785	0.02%	2,141	0.03%	3,355	0.03%	3,699	0.03%	3,545	0.03%	4,374	0.04%	4,737	0.05%	6,088	0.06%	6,790	0.06%	5,150	0.06%	6,577	0.04%
Chukchi	1,318	0.02%	1,504	0.02%	1,485	0.02%	1,585	0.02%	1,202	0.02%	1,178	0.01%	1,400	0.01%	1,370	0.01%	1,099	0.01%	946	0.01%	869	0.01%	934	0.01%	668	0.01%	359	0.00%	311	0.00%
Mansi	1,154	0.02%	1,463	0.02%	1,265	0.02%	1,014	0.01%	795	0.01%	758	0.01%	1,067	0.01%	1,017	0.01%	691	0.01%	650	0.01%	547	0.01%	640	0.01%	554	0.01%	359	0.00%	334	0.00%
Nanais	1,044	0.02%	1,258	0.01%	1,107	0.01%	872	0.01%	615	0.01%	628	0.01%	1,038	0.01%	982	0.01%	852	0.01%	629	0.01%	567	0.01%	640	0.01%	590	0.01%	422	0.00%	424	0.00%
Dolgans	760	0.01%	889	0.01%	836	0.01%	676	0.01%	582	0.01%	636	0.01%	780	0.01%	568	0.00%	479	0.00%	415	0.00%	430	0.00%	421	0.00%	302	0.00%	214	0.00%	194	0.00%
Koryaks	647	0.01%	747	0.01%	741	0.01%	544	0.01%	457	0.01%	523	0.01%	677	0.01%	653	0.01%	513	0.00%	447	0.00%	417	0.00%	426	0.00%	346	0.00%	193	0.00%	167	0.00%
Shors	539	0.01%	797	0.01%	821	0.01%	641	0.01%	557	0.01%	631	0.01%	961	0.01%	969	0.01%	761	0.01%	648	0.01%	725	0.01%	778	0.01%	814	0.01%	454	0.01%	485	0.00%
Karelians	483	0.01%	697	0.01%	822	0.01%	753	0.01%	667	0.01%	788	0.01%	1,476	0.01%	1,813	0.01%	2,316	0.02%	2,432	0.02%	2,385	0.03%	3,307	0.03%	4,621	0.04%	4,053	0.04%	5,809	0.04%
Nivkh	347	0.01%	394	0.00%	381	0.00%	319	0.00%	239	0.00%	251	0.00%	312	0.00%	305	0.00%	277	0.00%	213	0.00%	203	0.00%	189	0.00%	194	0.00%	132	0.00%	107	0.00%
Soyots	326	0.01%	444	0.01%	418	0.01%	349	0.00%	266	0.00%	288	0.00%	305	0.00%	365	0.00%	325	0.00%	277	0.00%	247	0.00%	225	0.00%	225	0.00%	141	0.00%	179	0.00%
Selkups	281	0.00%	360	0.00%	335	0.00%	267	0.00%	168	0.00%	203	0.00%	321	0.00%	317	0.00%	272	0.00%	221	0.00%	192	0.00%	173	0.00%	157	0.00%	131	0.00%	93	0.00%
Ulchs	220	0.00%	234	0.00%	266	0.00%	172	0.00%	126	0.00%	134	0.00%	221	0.00%	223	0.00%	183	0.00%	129	0.00%	120	0.00%	115	0.00%	143	0.00%	107	0.00%	88	0.00%
Itelmeni	187	0.00%	235	0.00%	238	0.00%	207	0.00%	128	0.00%	126	0.00%	217	0.00%	236	0.00%	214	0.00%	178	0.00%	147	0.00%	151	0.00%	151	0.00%	88	0.00%	119	0.00%
Yukaghir	177	0.00%	224	0.00%	194	0.00%	147	0.00%	129	0.00%	136	0.00%	144	0.00%	122	0.00%	108	0.00%	90	0.00%	96	0.00%	68	0.00%	75	0.00%	45	0.00%	58	0.00%
Teleuts	137	0.00%	210	0.00%	174	0.00%	141	0.00%	85	0.00%	107	0.00%	176	0.00%	200	0.00%	189	0.00%	127	0.00%	133	0.00%	160	0.00%	170	0.00%	111	0.00%	121	0.00%
Kumandins	133	0.00%	177	0.00%	202	0.00%	99	0.00%	82	0.00%	94	0.00%	171	0.00%	209	0.00%	187	0.00%	169	0.00%	179	0.00%	187	0.00%	238	0.00%	144	0.00%	185	0.00%
Nağaybäk	126	0.00%	218	0.00%	226	0.00%	146	0.00%	173	0.00%	232	0.00%	359	0.00%	415	0.00%	320	0.00%	380	0.00%	412	0.00%	611	0.01%	774	0.01%	576	0.01%	791	0.01%
Inuit /Yupik	123	0.00%	153	0.00%	132	0.00%	121	0.00%	111	0.00%	135	0.00%	151	0.00%	146	0.00%	124	0.00%	112	0.00%	87	0.00%	100	0.00%	79	0.00%	45	0.00%	40	0.00%
Udege	119	0.00%	113	0.00%	110	0.00%	93	0.00%	70	0.00%	75	0.00%	124	0.00%	115	0.00%	77	0.00%	80	0.00%	82	0.00%	89	0.00%	94	0.00%	50	0.00%	37	0.00%
Shapsugs	118	0.00%	160	0.00%	102	0.00%	84	0.00%	76	0.00%	129	0.00%	160	0.00%	162	0.00%	168	0.00%	153	0.00%	154	0.00%	201	0.00%	217	0.00%	169	0.00%	219	0.00%
Sami	106	0.00%	123	0.00%	127	0.00%	80	0.00%	80	0.00%	66	0.00%	133	0.00%	112	0.00%	121	0.00%	121	0.00%	101	0.00%	104	0.00%	92	0.00%	78	0.00%	106	0.00%
Veps	103	0.00%	139	0.00%	138	0.00%	140	0.00%	127	0.00%	153	0.00%	272	0.00%	333	0.00%	387	0.00%	323	0.00%	336	0.00%	459	0.00%	506	0.00%	495	0.01%	776	0.01%
Kamchadals	97	0.00%	112	0.00%	110	0.00%	104	0.00%	67	0.00%	73	0.00%	126	0.00%	142	0.00%	137	0.00%	119	0.00%	95	0.00%	112	0.00%	95	0.00%	85	0.00%	90	0.00%
Ket	92	0.00%	89	0.00%	107	0.00%	70	0.00%	52	0.00%	68	0.00%	103	0.00%	89	0.00%	79	0.00%	50	0.00%	56	0.00%	74	0.00%	69	0.00%	45	0.00%	53	0.00%
Tofalar	65	0.00%	68	0.00%	78	0.00%	68	0.00%	36	0.00%	57	0.00%	54	0.00%	76	0.00%	54	0.00%	27	0.00%	29	0.00%	34	0.00%	34	0.00%	26	0.00%	15	0.00%
Chuvans	61	0.00%	74	0.00%	77	0.00%	66	0.00%	49	0.00%	56	0.00%	72	0.00%	79	0.00%	67	0.00%	57	0.00%	42	0.00%	61	0.00%	47	0.00%	40	0.00%	55	0.00%
Nganasans	54	0.00%	71	0.00%	87	0.00%	52	0.00%	31	0.00%	55	0.00%	72	0.00%	61	0.00%	43	0.00%	40	0.00%	45	0.00%	30	0.00%	27	0.00%	12	0.00%	13	0.00%
Negidals	47	0.00%	57	0.00%	51	0.00%	44	0.00%	30	0.00%	27	0.00%	36	0.00%	40	0.00%	28	0.00%	28	0.00%	17	0.00%	27	0.00%	21	0.00%	18	0.00%	12	0.00%
Orochs	46	0.00%	58	0.00%	50	0.00%	36	0.00%	35	0.00%	36	0.00%	45	0.00%	43	0.00%	29	0.00%	42	0.00%	28	0.00%	27	0.00%	21	0.00%	19	0.00%	15	0.00%
Besermyan	46	0.00%	65	0.00%	81	0.00%	68	0.00%	48	0.00%	76	0.00%	125	0.00%	161	0.00%	150	0.00%	152	0.00%	177	0.00%	237	0.00%	280	0.00%	186	0.00%	215	0.00%
Oroks	25	0.00%	21	0.00%	26	0.00%	14	0.00%	12	0.00%	17	0.00%	30	0.00%	27	0.00%	23	0.00%	12	0.00%	13	0.00%	19	0.00%	18	0.00%	9	0.00%	3	0.00%
Aleut	17	0.00%	38	0.00%	39	0.00%	29	0.00%	21	0.00%	15	0.00%	30	0.00%	34	0.00%	36	0.00%	39	0.00%	20	0.00%	17	0.00%	19	0.00%	19	0.00%	26	0.00%
Enets	12	0.00%	19	0.00%	24	0.00%	16	0.00%	7	0.00%	13	0.00%	22	0.00%	18	0.00%	14	0.00%	13	0.00%	9	0.00%	11	0.00%	13	0.00%	7	0.00%	5	0.00%
Chulyms	10	0.00%	27	0.00%	23	0.00%	35	0.00%	20	0.00%	11	0.00%	39	0.00%	41	0.00%	25	0.00%	27	0.00%	29	0.00%	29	0.00%	33	0.00%	18	0.00%	15	0.00%
Taz	6	0.00%	16	0.00%	17	0.00%	12	0.00%	7	0.00%	13	0.00%	16	0.00%	17	0.00%	22	0.00%	29	0.00%	13	0.00%	18	0.00%	19	0.00%	12	0.00%	19	0.00%
Votes	4	0.00%	6	0.00%	5	0.00%	4	0.00%	3	0.00%	8	0.00%	6	0.00%	12	0.00%	6	0.00%	9	0.00%	7	0.00%	10	0.00%	10	0.00%	3	0.00%	12	0.00%
Izhorians	3	0.00%	7	0.00%	8	0.00%	6	0.00%	11	0.00%	5	0.00%	22	0.00%	12	0.00%	18	0.00%	19	0.00%	16	0.00%	16	0.00%	28	0.00%	14	0.00%	42	0.00%
Kereks	0	0.00%	1	0.00%	1	0.00%	1	0.00%	4	0.00%	0	0.00%	3	0.00%	2	0.00%	3	0.00%	5	0.00%	1	0.00%	0	0.00%	0	0.00%	1	0.00%	1	0.00%
Other or not stated	888,503	13.72%	1,045,980	12.15%	885,385	10.85%	910,671	12.04%	1,237,899	15.97%	1,158,871	14.52%	1,754,803	14.43%	1,878,708	14.40%	1,586,785	13.62%	1,344,569	12.91%	1,164,062	12.64%	1,165,318	12.05%	1,151,018	10.81%	976,389	10.82%	1,635,683	11.04%
Total	6,474,099	100%	8,610,964	100%	8,160,372	100%	7,563,304	100%	7,750,398	100%	7,983,625	100%	12,156,975	100%	13,043,984	100%	11,653,990	100%	10,413,632	100%	9,209,284	100%	9,670,775	100%	10,648,786	100%	9,024,308	100%	14,817,627	100%

Population pyramids of ethnicities within Russia in the 2021 census

Russians

Bashkirs

Tatars

Chechens

Ukrainians

Kazakhs

Kabardians

Chuvash

Avars

Armenians

Crimean Tatars

Germans

Belarusians

Tajiks

Uzbeks

Tuvans

Kumyks

Dargins

Buryats

Azeribaijanis

Ingush

stated No ethnicity

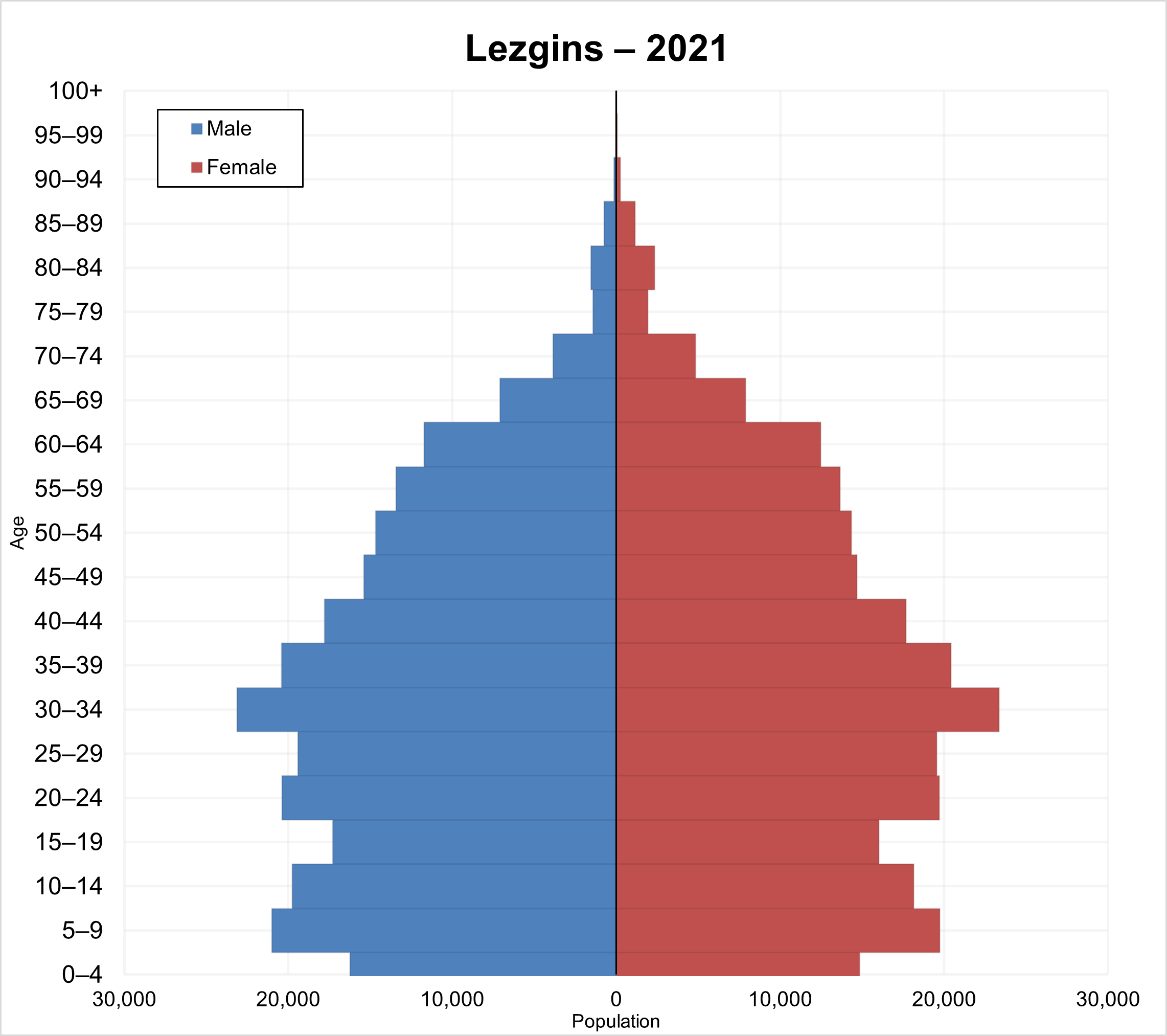
Lezgins

== Future projections ==
The ethnic demographic mix of the Russian Federation is projected to change far into the future. The majority population, ethnic Russians, who have been in slight decline since the 1950s will decline further due to a below replacement fertility rate and population ageing. In 2010, rough population projections from Ivan Beloborodov projecting to 2030 estimated that the percentage of Russians within the population would decrease to around 70 to 60% of the total population.

== Language and culture ==
Although the constitution of Russia recognizes Russian as the official language, the individual republics may declare one or more official languages. Many of these subjects have at least two—Russian and the language of the "eponymous" nationality. There is a minority language scene in most subjects of the country, with more than 1,350 newspapers and magazines, 300 TV channels and 250 radio stations in over 50 of these minority languages. Moreover, new legislation allows usage of minority languages in federal radio and TV broadcasting.

In 2007, there were 6,260 schools which provided teaching in 38 minority languages. Over 75 minority languages were taught as a discipline in 10,404 schools. The Ministers of Council of Europe has noted significant efforts to improve the supply of minority language textbooks and teachers, as well as a greater availability of minority language teaching. However, as Ministers has noted, there remain shortcomings in the access to education of a person(s) belonging to certain minorities.

There are more than 2,000 national minorities' public associations and 560 national cultural autonomies, however the Committee of Ministers has noted that in many regions, amount of state support for the preservation and development of minority cultures is still inadequate. There's a significant difference between "eponymous" ethnic groups and nationalities without their own national territory, as resources of the last are relatively limited.

Population of Russia by language family, 2021 census
(% of those who declared ethnicity)
1. Slavic (81.7%)
2. Turkic (8.64%)
3. Caucasian (4.32%)
4. Uralic (1.26%)
5. Armenian (0.73%)
6. Iranian (0.69%)
7. Mongolic (0.49%)
8. Other (2.15%)

Language family	Population	Percentage
Slavic (Russians, Ukrainians, Belarusians, Poles, Bulgarians, Serbs, Czechs, Rusyns, Slovaks, Croats, Macedonians, Slovenes, Bosnians, Montenegrins)	106,709,884	81.72%
Turkic (Tatars, Bashkirs, Chuvash, Kazakhs, Kumyks, Yakuts, Azerbaijanis, Uzbeks, Tuvans, Crimean Tatars, Karachays, Kyrgyz, Balkars, Turks, Nogais, Altai, Khakas, Turkmens, Shors, Gagauz, Dolgans, Nagaibak, Soyots, Meskhetian Turks, Kumandins, Uyghurs, Teleuts, Krymchaks, Karakalpaks, Tofalar, Crimean Karaites, Chulyms)	11,287,749	8.64%
Caucasian (Chechens, Avars, Dargins, Kabardians, Ingush, Lezgins, Laks, Tabasarans, Cherkess, Georgians, Adyghe, Abazins, Aghuls, Rutuls, Tsakhurs, Abkhazians, Udis, Shapsugs)	5,642,353	4.32%
Uralic (Mordvins, Mari, Udmurts, Komi, Komi-Permyaks, Nenets, Karelians, Khanty, Mansi, Estonians, Finns, Vepsians, Selkups, Besermyan, Sami, Hungarians, Nganasan, Izhorians, Enets, Votians)	1,649,635	1.26%
Armenian (Armenians, Hemshins)	948,254	0.73%
Iranian (Ossetians, Tajiks, Yazidis, Kurds, Talysh, Afghans, Persians, Tat, Pamiris)	897,403	0.69%
Mongolic (Buryats, Kalmyks, Mongols)	640,918	0.49%
Other	2,811,168	2.15%

== Indigenous peoples ==
Russia is also home to a particular category of minority peoples, i.e. small indigenous peoples of the North and Far East, who maintain very traditional lifestyles, often in a hazardous climatic environment, while adapting to the modern world. After the fall of the Soviet Union, Russia passed legislation to protect rights of these small northern indigenous peoples.

Gil-Robles has noted agreements between indigenous representatives and oil companies, which are to compensate potential damages on peoples habitats due to oil exploration. As Committee of Ministers of Council of Europe noted in 2007, despite some initiatives for development, the social and economic situation of numerically small indigenous peoples was affected by recent legislative amendments at the federal level, removing some positive measures as regards their access to land and other natural resources.

== Maps ==
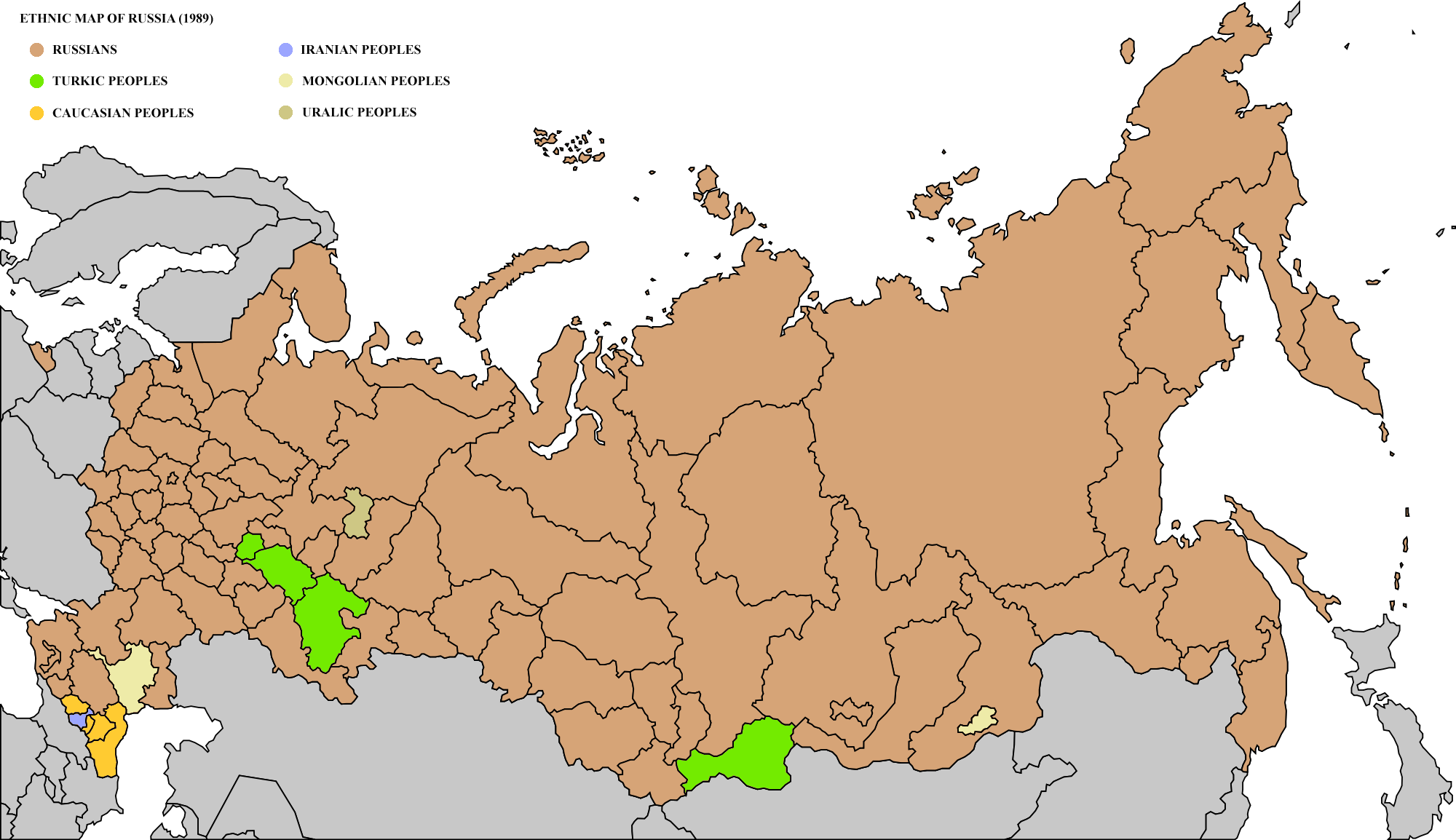
1989 ethnic map of Russia showing the largest ethnic group of each region or Republic; with brown as Russians, green as Turkic peoples

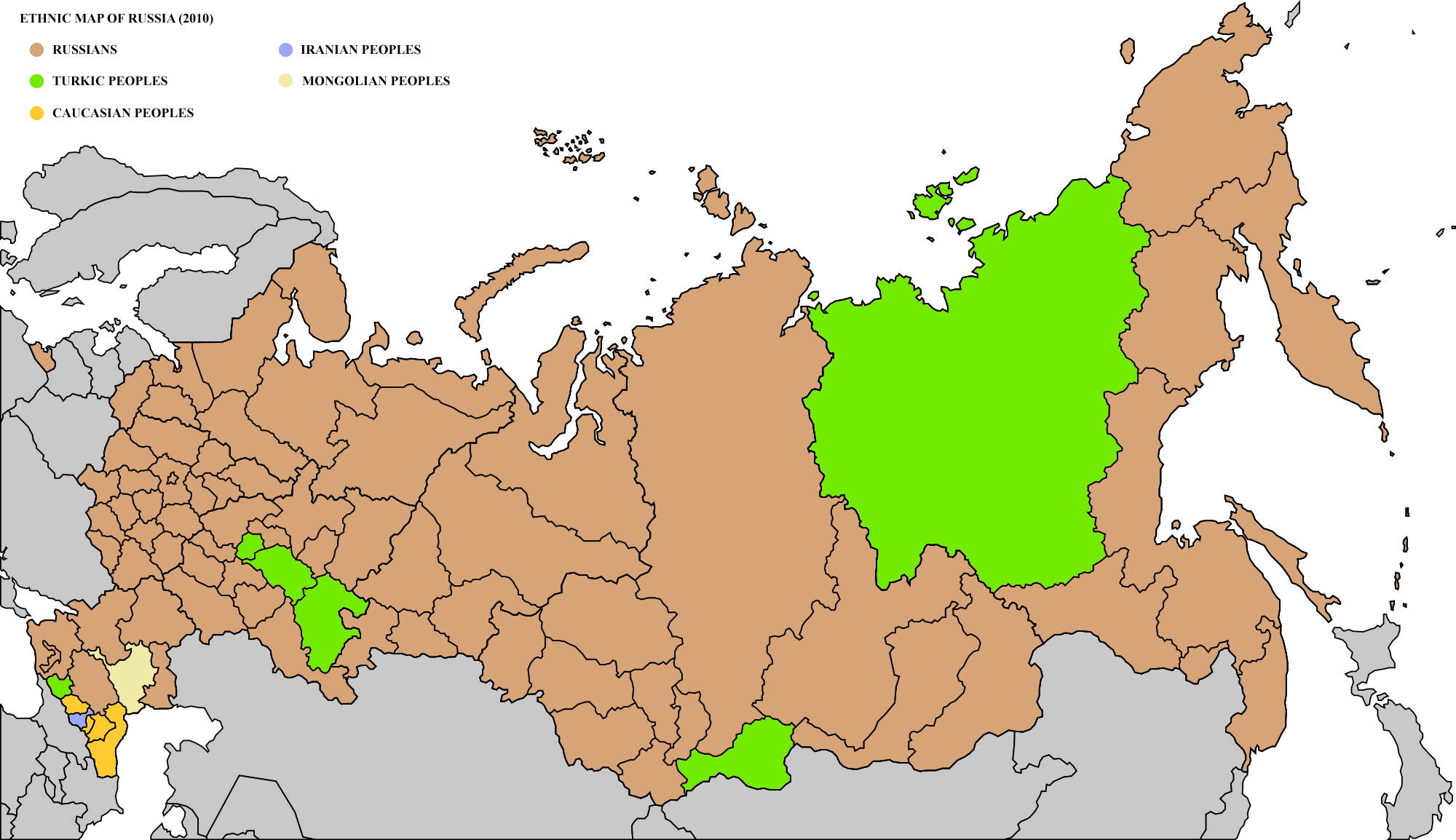
Ethnic map of Russia, 2010

Largest ethnic group apart from Russians: yellow – Ukrainians, lawn green – Tatars, green – Kazakhs, orange – Armenians, blue – Buryats, gray-blue – Germans, pink – Koreans

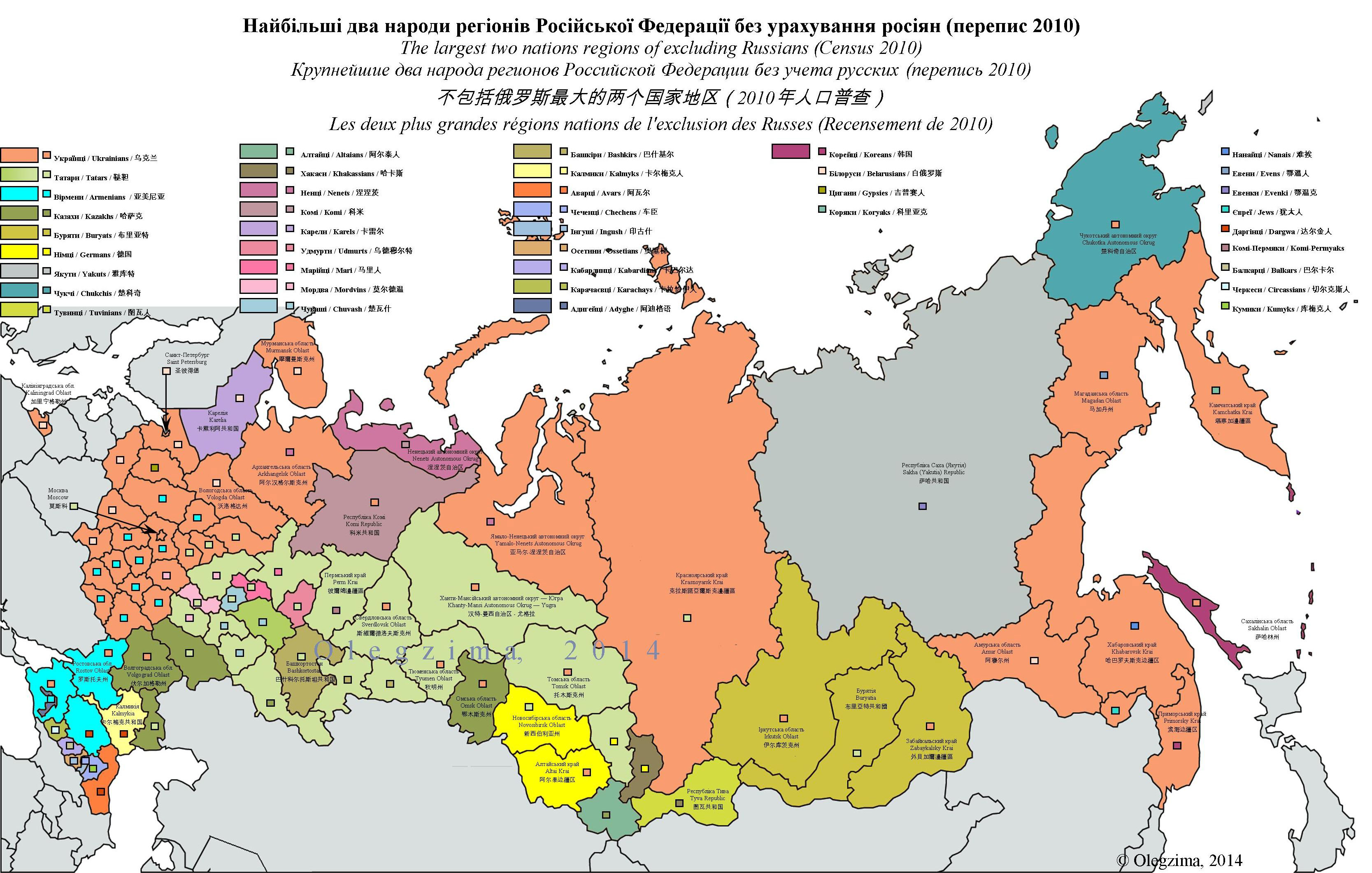
The largest two ethnic groups, excluding Russians, in each region (Census 2010)

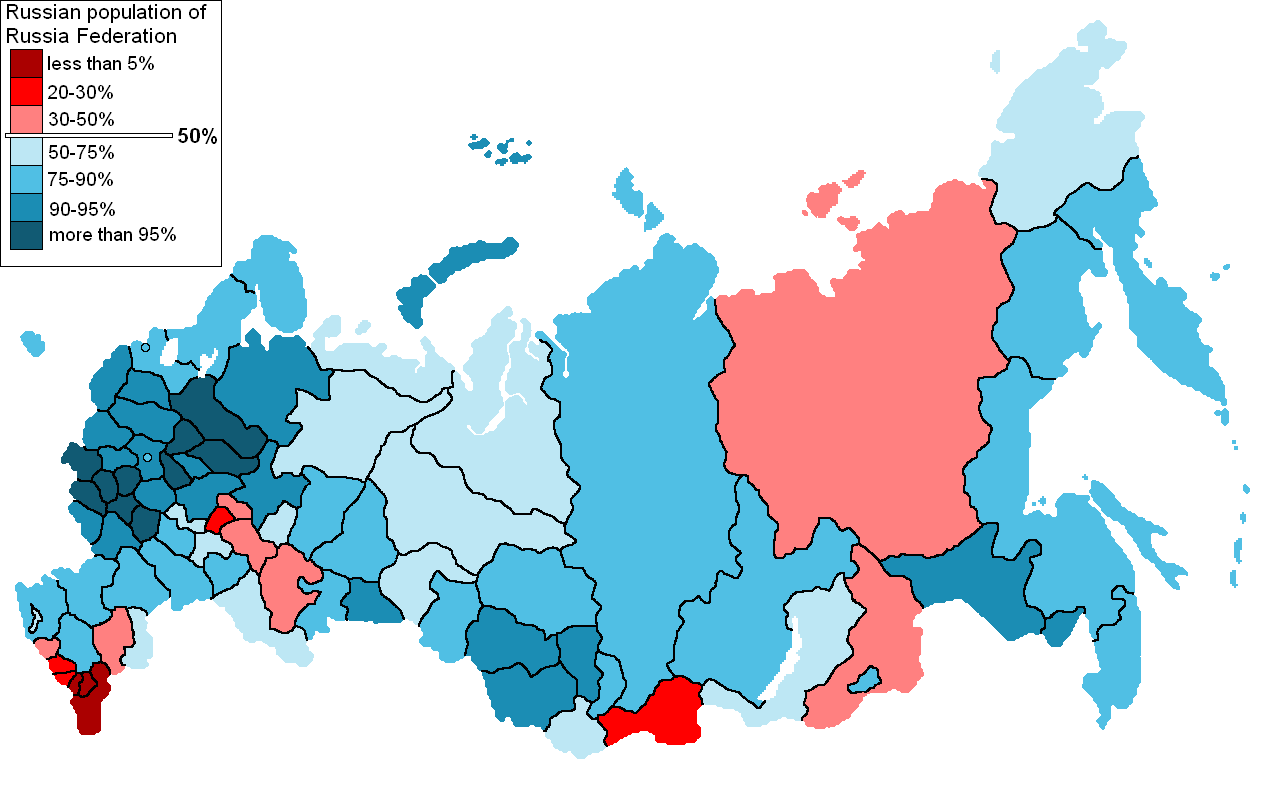
Distribution of Russians, 2010

Distribution of Tatars, 2010

Distribution of Ukrainians, 2010

Distribution of Bashkirs, 2010

Distribution of Chuvashs, 2010

Distribution of Chechens, 2010

Distribution of Armenians, 2010

Distribution of Mordvins, 2010

Distribution of Kazakhs, 2010

Distribution of Azerbaijanis, 2010

Distribution of Belarusians, 2010

Distribution of Germans, 2010

== See also ==
- Demographics of Russia
- List of ethnic groups in Russia

Indigenous peoples:

- Indigenous peoples of Siberia
- List of endangered languages in Russia
- List of extinct indigenous peoples of Russia
- List of larger indigenous peoples of Russia
- List of minor indigenous peoples of Russia
