= Lists of indigenous peoples of Russia =

Lists of indigenous peoples of Russia cover the indigenous ethnic groups in Russia other than Russians. As of 2010 these constituted about 20% of the population. The period lists are organized by the official classifications based on the number of people in each group and their location.

- List of minor indigenous peoples of Russia, as defined by the Russian doctrine. The list is sorted by region
- List of larger indigenous peoples of Russia
- Indigenous small-numbered peoples of the North, Siberia and the Far East
- List of extinct indigenous peoples of Russia

== See also ==
- Demographics of Russia
- Ethnic groups in Russia
- Indigenous peoples of Siberia
