= List of minor indigenous peoples of Russia =

The following peoples are officially recognized minor indigenous peoples of Russia. Many of them are included into the Common List of Minor Indigenous Peoples of Russia (Единый перечень коренных малочисленных народов России) approved by the government of Russia on March 24, 2000 and updated in subsequent years.

These peoples satisfy the following criteria:

- To live in their historical territory;
- To preserve traditional way of life, occupations, and trades;
- To self-recognize themselves as a separate ethnicity;
- To have a population of at most 50,000 within Russia.

Some of them, such as Soyots, were recognized only after the dissolution of the Soviet Union.

These peoples subject to benefits according to a number of laws aimed at preservation and support of these ethnicities.

Ten of these peoples count less than 1,000 and 11 of them live beyond the Arctic Circle.

== Far North ==
Far North is the part of Russia which lies mainly beyond the Arctic Circle.

- Ainus (Айны): Kamchatka Krai, Sakhalin Oblast
- Aleuts (Алеуты): Kamchatka Krai
- Alyutors (Алюторцы): Kamchatka Krai
- Chukchis (чукчи): Chukotka Autonomous Okrug, Magadan Oblast, Kamchatka Krai
- Chuvans (чуванцы): Chukotka Autonomous Okrug, Magadan Oblast
- Dolgans (долганы): Krasnoyarsk Krai, Sakha Republic
- Enets (*) (энцы) (Yenets, Russian plural: Entsy, obsolete: Yenisei Samoyeds, Yenisei Ostyak, Kets): Krasnoyarsk Krai
- Siberian Yupik (Yuit, Yupigyt, эскимосы): Chukotka Autonomous Okrug

- Chaplino
- Naukan
- Sirenik Yupik

- Itelmens (ительмены): Kamchatka Krai, Magadan Oblast
- Kamchadals (камчадалы, a general term for mixed population of Kamchatka Peninsula): Kamchatka Krai
- Kereks (кереки): Chukotka Autonomous Okrug
- Komi peoples formerly known as Komi-Izhemtsy, Izhma Komi (Коми-ижемцы, alt. name: Izvataz): north of the Komi Republic
- Koryaks (коряки): Kamchatka Krai, Chukotka Autonomous Okrug, Magadan Oblast
- Nenets (*) (Russian plural: Nentsy, old Russian name Samoyeds) (ненцы): Yamalo-Nenets Autonomous Okrug, Krasnoyarsk Krai, Khanty–Mansi Autonomous Okrug, Arkhangelsk Oblast, Komi Republic
- Nganasans (Tavgi) (нганасаны): Krasnoyarsk Krai
- Sami (old Russian name Lopars, i.e., Lapp) (саамы, саамы): Murmansk Oblast
- Veps (*) (вепсы): Republic of Karelia, Leningrad Oblast
- Yukaghirs (юкагиры): Sakha Republic, Chukotka Autonomous Okrug, Magadan Oblast

== Central Siberia ==
- Chulyms (чулымцы): Krasnoyarsk Krai
- Evenks (obsolete: Tungus) (эвенки): Sakha Republic, Krasnoyarsk Krai, Khabarovsk Krai, Amur Oblast, Sakhalin Oblast, Buryat Republic, Irkutsk Oblast, Chita Oblast, Tomsk Oblast, Tyumen Oblast
- Evens (эвены) (obsolete: Lamuts (ламуты)): Sakha Republic, Khabarovsk Krai, Magadan Oblast, Chukotka Autonomous Okrug, Kamchatka Krai
- Kets (кеты): Krasnoyarsk Krai
- Khantys (Ostyaks, obsolete) (ханты)
- Mansi (Voguls, obsolete) (манси): Khanty–Mansi Autonomous Okrug, Tyumen Oblast, Sverdlovsk Oblast, Komi Republic
- Selkups (селькупы): Yamalo-Nenets Autonomous Okrug, Tyumen Oblast, Tomsk Oblast, Krasnoyarsk Krai
- Teleuts (телеуты): Kemerovo Oblast

== Far East ==
- Nanais (Russian plural: Nanaitsy) (нанайцы): Khabarovsk Krai, Primorsky Krai, Sakhalin Oblast
- Negidals (негидальцы): Khabarovsk Krai
- Nivkh people (нивхи): Khabarovsk Krai, Sakhalin Oblast
- Oroch people (орочи): Khabarovsk Krai
- Orok people (Ulta, Uilta) (ороки, ульта): Sakhalin Oblast
- Taz people (тазы): Primorsky Krai
- Udege people (удэгейцы): Primorsky Krai, Khabarovsk Krai
- Ulch people (*) (ульчи): Khabarovsk Krai

== Southern Siberia ==
- Kumandins (кумандинцы): Altai Krai, Altai Republic, Kemerovo Oblast
- Chelkans (челканцы): Altai Republic
- Shorians (шорцы): Kemerovo Oblast, Republic of Khakassia, Altai Republic
- Soyots (сойоты): Buryat Republic
- Telengits (теленгиты): Altai Republic
- Tofalars (тофалары): Irkutsk Oblast
- Tubalars (тубалары): Altai Republic
- Tuvans-Todzhins (Tuvintses-Todjintses, тувинцы-тоджинцы): Tuva Republic

== Peoples of Dagestan with population less than 50,000 ==
According to a 2000 decree of the government of Russian Federation, Dagestan was supposed to compile their own list of small-numbered Indigenous peoples, to be included in the overall List of small-numbered Indigenous peoples of Russia The peoples below fall under the criteria of the decree, but were not included into the list in 2000.

- Laks
- Tabasarans
- Rutuls
- Aguls
- Tsakhurs
- Kumyks
- Nogais

=== Tiny groups ===
There are about 40 other tiny ethnic groups in Dagestan, with total number of less than 40,000.

- Andis
- Akhvakh
- Archins
- Bagvalals
- Bezhta
- Botlikhs
- Chamalals
- Godoberi
- Hinukh
- Hunzibs
- Khwarshi
- Karata
- Tindis
- Tsez

== Other ==
- Abazins (абазины): Karachay–Cherkessia
- Ainu: Sakhalin Oblast, Khabarovsk Krai and Kamchatka Krai
- Besermyan (бесермяне): Udmurt Republic
- Izhorians (ижорцы): Leningrad Oblast
- Karelians (карелы): titular nation of the Republic of Karelia
- Nagaybaks (нагайбаки): Chelyabinsk Oblast and Republic of Bashkortostan
- Setos (Сету): Pskov Oblast
- Shapsugs (шапсуги): Krasnodar Krai
- Votes (Водь): Leningrad Oblast
- Qaratay (каратаи): Republic of Tatarstan (no official recognition)

== Demographics ==
=== Median Age ===
Most peoples with smaller populations have median ages that are considerably lower than the Russian average. The below table is taken from the Russian census of 2002. For example, the median age of ethnic Russians was 37.6 years, while that of Yuraq Samoyeds was 26.2 years.

Ethnic Group	Total	Male	Female	Urban	Ur.Male	Ur.Female	Rural	R.Male	R.Female
Yuraq Samoyed (Nenet)	26.2	24.6	27.6	25.7	23.1	27.4	26.3	24.8	27.7
Tavgi Samoyed (Nganassan)	26.6	25.8	27.2	24.2	22.1	25.4	27.1	26.5	27.7
Chukchi	26.6	25.1	27.9	25.1	22.5	26.9	26.9	25.6	28.1
Taimyr Samoyed (Dolgan)	26.7	25.1	28.0	26.0	23.2	27.6	26.8	25.4	28.1
Ostyak	26.8	24.9	28.3	27.1	24.5	28.9	26.6	25.1	28.1
Yenisei Samoyed (Enet)	27.0	25.5	28.4	30.4	20.0	35.6	26.5	26.0	27.0
Todzhin	27.3	26.8	27.7	32.5	45.0	7.5	27.3	26.8	27.7
Yup'ik	27.3	25.5	28.9	26.2	23.3	28.3	27.7	26.1	29.2
Koryaks	27.4	26.3	28.5	25.4	23.0	27.2	28.3	27.4	29.0
Sayan Samoyed (Karagas/Tofalar)	27.5	27.1	28.0	28.9	25.4	33.6	27.4	27.2	27.7
Vogul	27.6	25.2	29.5	27.4	24.3	29.6	27.8	26.0	29.3
Yukaghir	27.6	25.8	29.2	28.1	25.4	30.6	27.2	26.2	28.2
Telengit	27.9	26.5	29.3	25.3	25.4	25.3	28.0	26.6	29.5
Evenks	28.0	26.5	29.3	28.1	26.1	29.8	27.9	26.6	29.1
Soyots	28.0	26.6	29.5	25.5	23.6	27.1	28.3	26.9	29.7
Evens	28.1	25.6	30.0	28.4	24.6	30.4	28.0	25.9	29.7
Yenisei Ostyak (Ket)	28.1	25.9	30.3	30.5	25.6	32.8	27.7	25.9	29.5
Gilyak (Nivkh)	28.3	26.4	30.0	29.1	26.6	31.1	27.7	26.2	29.1
Oroks	28.4	27.1	29.7	28.6	27.8	29.5	28.0	26.1	30.0
Oroch	28.8	27.4	30.1	28.3	23.2	32.8	29.1	29.6	28.7
Chuvans	29.2	27.6	30.5	30.4	28.0	31.8	28.7	27.4	29.9
Goldyak (Nanai)	30.1	28.9	31.1	31.7	30.5	32.6	29.4	28.3	30.5
Udihe	30.1	28.5	31.6	30.6	29.1	31.5	30.0	28.4	31.7
Ulch	30.3	27.5	32.7	37.2	31.8	40.8	29.1	26.8	31.1
Ostyak Samoyed (Selkup)	30.4	28.8	31.9	33.2	31.0	35.1	29.9	28.5	31.3
Negidal	30.5	26.8	33.5	33.5	29.5	36.1	29.6	26.1	32.6
Itel	30.7	28.0	33.0	30.6	27.2	33.4	30.7	28.4	32.8
Chelkan	31.0	29.7	32.0	30.7	28.8	32.7	31.1	29.9	31.9
Tubalar	32.1	31.1	33.1	34.1	32.1	35.7	31.9	31.0	32.8
Sami	32.1	29.2	34.6	32.5	28.5	35.3	31.9	29.6	34.1
Aleut	32.1	32.3	32.0	31.2	34.2	29.4	32.4	31.9	32.9
Kamchadal	33.2	31.7	34.4	32.6	31.6	33.4	33.8	31.9	35.7
Teleut	33.9	31.3	36.1	33.1	30.9	35.0	34.5	31.6	36.9
Shor	34.0	32.0	35.8	33.8	31.5	35.7	34.6	33.1	35.9
Chulym	34.2	33.8	34.6	39.3	36.6	41.8	33.8	33.6	34.0
Abaza	34.7	32.7	36.6	31.7	30.6	32.7	36.5	33.9	39.0
Taz	35.8	33.2	38.2	36.3	32.9	39.6	35.5	33.3	37.5
Shapsugh	38.5	37.3	39.7	38.5	36.6	40.4	38.5	37.5	39.5
Besermian	40.8	37.7	43.8	41.4	40.9	41.9	40.6	36.8	44.4
Kumandin	40.9	36.4	44.6	41.1	35.7	45.4	40.6	37.1	43.6
Nagaibak	41.1	38.5	43.3	43.9	41.6	45.6	40.6	38.0	42.8
Veps	49.8	44.9	53.1	47.0	41.9	50.1	53.1	48.1	56.8
Kerek	60.8	52.5	77.5				60.8	52.5	77.5
Izhor	65.8	59.4	67.9	61.8	60.2	62.8	67.2	59.0	69.3

=== Birth Rate ===
The below table gives the average birth rate for Smaller Ethnic groups for the 1997-2002 period based on the 2002 census. (per 1000 people) Source: For most of the groups the birth rate was more than the death rate. For example for the Yuraq Samoyeds the birth rate was more than double the death rate. But for ethnic groups like Veps (Death rate 7 times the birth rate) the reverse was true. For Ingrians, not a single birth was recorded in 1992-2002 period. The youngest of the Ingrians are 3 people in 10-14 age group (Total ethnic population 327, of which more than 60% are above 70 years of age. The 1989 population was 820, signifying a decline of 2.5 times)

Group	Total	Urban	Rural
Abaza	11.40	11.70	11.23
Aleut	13.45	10.42	14.29
Besermian	7.27	2.71	8.57
Veps	3.48	3.68	3.25
Taimyr Samoyed (Dolgan)	18.60	13.23	19.68
Izhor	0.00	0.00	0.00
Itel	15.72	13.44	16.92
Kamchadal	13.61	14.95	11.99
Kerek	0.00	0.00	0.00
Yenisei Ostyak (Ket)	16.65	15.08	16.97
Koryaks	16.30	17.15	15.96
Kumandin	7.89	7.10	8.78
Vogul	19.08	18.92	19.24
Nagaibak	7.20	3.87	7.83
Goldyak (Nanai)	12.67	8.48	14.33
Tavgi Samoyed (Nganassan)	11.10	13.61	10.54
Negidal	15.84	10.43	17.44
Yuraq Samoyed (Nenet)	21.74	17.55	22.60
Nivkh (Gilyak)	15.83	12.05	19.15
Oroch	10.80	6.67	13.04
Lapp	14.58	13.82	15.06
Ostyak Samoyed (Selkup)	14.74	8.68	15.89
Soyots	17.45	6.90	18.43
Taz	10.94	8.89	12.05
Telengit	17.57	9.20	17.89
Teleut	9.94	9.39	10.34
Sayan Samoyed (Karagas/Tofalar)	16.60	0.00	17.62
Tubalar	14.87	11.67	15.15
Todzhin	19.35	0.00	19.36
Udihe	15.02	5.93	17.59
Oroks	12.08	7.10	18.60
Ulch	14.79	7.75	16.05
Ostyak	19.62	18.19	20.33
Chelkan	19.28	15.93	19.80
Chuvans	16.16	13.56	17.27
Chukchi	19.07	15.86	19.70
Chulym	11.51	13.64	11.35
Shapsugh	10.27	6.82	11.40
Shor	10.13	9.32	12.12
Evenks	16.21	11.34	17.66
Evens	17.11	13.89	18.58
Yenisei Samoyed (Enet)	17.26	8.33	18.50
Yup'ik	15.65	16.75	15.26
Yukaghir	18.03	17.00	18.77

== See also ==
- List of extinct Indigenous peoples of Russia
- Demographics of Siberia
- Pomors
- Kola Norwegians
- Lists of Indigenous peoples of Russia
