= Arman language =

Dialect of Even

Arman
- Armanskij
- ääwnä
- Native to: Russia
- Region: Arman river
- Ethnicity: Evens
- Extinct: 1970s
- Language family: Tungusic: Northern; Ewenic; Even; Arman

Language codes
- ISO 639-3: None (mis)
- Glottolog: arma1243
- Linguasphere: 44-CAA-aad
- Arman is classified as Extinct by the UNESCO Atlas of the World's Languages in Danger.

Arman (also known as Armanskij) is an extinct language or dialect of Even that was around the Arman river in Magadan Oblast, Russia. Arman is known as a transitory variety of Evenki and Even. Arman went extinct in the 1970s.

== Classification ==
Arman has been classified as a Ewenic language in the Tungusic language family.

The classification of Arman as a language or dialect of Even is more controversial. Initially, L. D. Rišes and V. I. Cincius stated Arman as a dialect of Evenki. E. A. Kreĭnovich agreed with them, stating that Arman is a linguistic autonomous system of Even. Japanese scholars such as Jiro Ikegami have so far ignored the topic.

Gerhard Doerfer was the first person to argue for Arman being a separate language from Even, which Klavdiya Novikova and José Andrés Alonso de la Fuente has also echoed among other scholars. Glottolog has also classified Arman as a separate language from Even under their Ewenic languages. Natalia Aralova stated that the question if Arman was a language or dialect cannot be answered.

== Features ==
Arman has archaic features also found in Evenki such as the word-initial consonants of s-, l-, n- and j-.

== Glossary ==
The separation between Arman and Even can be shown with the Arman word boro-n’či(horsehair), which in Even is mura-nra. Malchukov also presents different words such as ewne (Ewen) and ŋees (nose).

The following is a list of Arman compared to Even dialects and other Tungusic languages from José Andrés Alonso de la Fuente.

| English | Arman | Literary Ewen | East Ewenki | West Ewenki | Literary Ewenki | Proto-Tungusic | Northern Tungusic |
|---|---|---|---|---|---|---|---|
| sun | ɥoolteŋ | yultän ~ ñultän ~ dilacaa | ñööltin ~ ñuëltin | ñööltən | dilacaa ~ siguun | | |
| small; little, less | abla | | | | | *abul.ĭ | *abŏl |
| net | adla | adӛl | adal | adol | | | *adŏl/*adul.ĭ |
| little; less | abaltï/ablajï | abӛlӛc | abalac/*abŏl | abolot | | | |
| tumor | aval | **avla | | | | | |
| evening | sisäätnä | hiisäcin | | | | | |
| sea | nam | lam | | | | | |
| Arman | ääwnä | äwən | | | | | |
| swan | üüsï | xüüsï | | | | | |
| shaman | samaan | hamaan | | | | | |
| fish | ol’cï | olrӛ | | | | | |
| all | kupsä | kubəc | | | | | |
| to kill | waa- | maa- | | | | *waa- | |

== Bibliography ==
- Alonso de la Fuente, José Andrés (2014). "Review of Armanisches Wörterbuch, by Gerhard Doerfer & Michael Knüppel". Wiener Zeitschrift für die Kunde des Morgenlandes. 104. Academia.edu: 412–417. JSTOR 24361819.
