= Varvara Belolyubskaya =

Russian linguist

- Варвара Григорьевна Белолюбская
- Born: 5 September 1948 (age 78)

Academic background
- Education: Yakutsk State University
- Thesis: Service words in the Even language (1997)

Academic work
- Discipline: Linguist
- Institutions: Yakutsk State University

Varvara Grigoryevna Belolyubskaya (sometimes Belolyubskaya-Arkouk) (Russian: Варвара Григорьевна Белолюбская; born 5 September 1948) is an Even linguist and poet.

== Biography ==
Belolyubskaya was born at the Us-Koyol camp, Oymyakonsky District, Yakut Autonomous Soviet Socialist Republic into a reindeer herder's family. She graduated from Oymyakon High School in 1966, and received her degree from the Faculty of History and Philology from Yakutsk State University in 1973.

She began her career as an educator in secondary schools in 1970, and in 1986 began to teach Russian and Even at Yakutsk Teacher Training School No. 1. In 1991 she joined the faculty of Northern Philology at Yakutsk State University, eventually rising to the position of chair. From 1986 she has been active as a broadcaster in the Even language. Her thesis, which she defended in 1997 before the Russian Academy of Sciences, is on the subject of "Service words in the Even language". Belolyubskaya is the author of the poetry collection My Sunny Flower, published in 1991; her poems have also appeared in numerous magazines, and she has published extensively on the ethnography of the peoples of the Russian north.

== Awards and honours ==
Her work has received numerous awards throughout her career, and she has been named an Honored Worker of Education of the Republic of Sakha (Yakutia).
