= Aghul =

Aghul or Agul may refer to:

- Aghul people, people of the Caucasus from southern Dagestan and northern Azerbaijan
- Aghul language, their Lezgic language
