= List of larger indigenous peoples of Russia =

The list of larger Indigenous peoples of Russia includes extant Indigenous peoples in the territory of Russia who are not listed in the official list of minor Indigenous peoples of Russia. Some of the minor Indigenous peoples who gave rise to the names of autonomous okrugs also included in this list.

== Far East ==
- Buryats, ethnicity and titular people of Buryatia, federal subject of Russia;
- Chukchi (Note: Although Chukchis, Nenets, Khanty and Mansi are titular peoples of listed federal subjects, they are considered as minor Indigenous peoples of Russia.), ethnicity and titular people of Chukotka Autonomous Okrug, federal subject of Russia;
- Yakuts, ethnicity and titular people of Republic of Sakha (Yakutia), federal subject of Russia;

== North Caucasus ==
- Balkars, ethnicity and titular people of Kabardino-Balkaria, federal subject of Russia;
- Chechens, ethnicity and titular people of Chechnya, federal subject of Russia;
- Ingushs, ethnicity and titular people of Ingushetia, federal subject of Russia;
- Karachays, ethnicity and titular people of Karachay-Cherkessia, federal subject of Russia;
- Ossetians, ethnicity and titular people of North Ossetia-Alania, federal subject of Russia;

=== Indigenous peoples of Dagestan ===
This small republic has a relatively large number of ethnic groups and languages. According to a 2000 decree of the government of Russian Federation, Dagestan was supposed to compile its own list of small-numbered Indigenous peoples, to be included in the overall list of minor Indigenous peoples of Russia.

- Aghuls
- Avars
- Aukhovite Chechens
- Ethnic Azerbaijanis in Dagestan (mainly in Derbent and its suburbs)
- Dargins
- Kumyks
- Laks
- Lezgins
- Nogais
- Ethnic Russians
- Rutuls
- Tabasarans
- Tats
- Tsakhurs

== Northwest ==
- Karelians, ethnicity and titular people of Karelia, federal subject of Russia;
- Komi, ethnicity and titular people of Komi Republic, federal subject of Russia;
- Nenets, ethnicity and titular people of Nenets Autonomous Okrug and Yamalo-Nenets Autonomous Okrug, federal subjects of Russia;

== Siberia ==
- Altai, ethnicity and titular people of Altai Republic, federal subject of Russia;
- Khakas, ethnicity and titular people of Khakassia, federal subject of Russia;
- Tuvans, ethnicity and titular people of Tuva, federal subject of Russia;

== South ==
- Crimean Tatars, ethnicity and titular people of Republic of Crimea, federal subject of Russia (since 2014.03.18 under dispute between Russia and Ukraine);
- Kalmyks, ethnicity and titular people of Kalmykia, federal subject of Russia;

== Ural ==
- Khanty, ethnicity and titular people of Khanty-Mansi Autonomous Okrug, federal subject of Russia;
- Mansi, ethnicity and titular people of Khanty-Mansi Autonomous Okrug, federal subject of Russia;
- Nenets, ethnicity and titular people of Nenets Autonomous Okrug and Yamalo-Nenets Autonomous Okrug, federal subjects of Russia;

== Volga region ==
- Bashkirs, ethnicity and titular people of Bashkortostan, federal subject of Russia;
- Chuvash, ethnicity and titular people of Chuvashia, federal subject of Russia;
- Mari, ethnicity and titular people of Mari El, federal subject of Russia;
- Mordvin, ethnicity and titular people of Mordovia, federal subject of Russia;
- Tatars, ethnicity and titular people of Tatarstan, federal subject of Russia;
- Udmurts, ethnicity and titular people of Udmurtia, federal subject of Russia.

== See also ==
- List of Indigenous peoples of Russia
