= List of extinct indigenous peoples of Russia =

This is a list of extinct indigenous peoples of Russia. The list does not include ancient or classical historical tribes in the period of 4000 BC to 500 AD. The list includes tribes of Russia from 500 AD to 1519 AD, also including endangered groups for comparison that are nearing extinction, facing an extinction vortex (500 members or less by the 2002 Census).

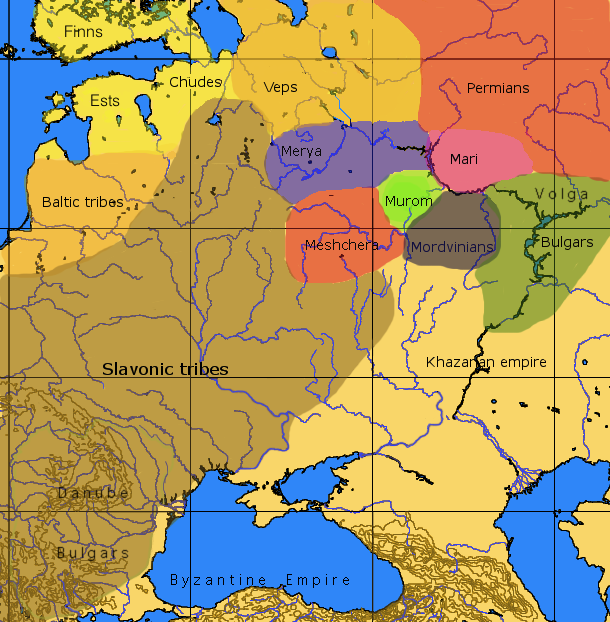
A general map of Russian territory prior to Slavic colonization.

== Extinct ==
Slavic migration began in the 6th century and some of Indigenous peoples who lived in European Russia and Siberia assimilated by the Russians.

- Anaoul Yukaghir assimilated after 18th century
- Asan people: In the 18th and 19th centuries they were assimilated by the Evenks
- Bulaqs: conquered by the Russians
- Chud: extinct after the 12th century.
- Khodynt Yukaghir extinct due to a plague in the late 17th century.
- Mators: extinction in 1840s, assimilated by the Russians and Siberian Turkics.
- Volga Bulgars became extinct some time after a Mongol attack in 1430. In modern ethnic nationalism, there is some "rivalry for the Bulgar legacy" (see Bulgarism). The Volga Tatars, Chuvash, Bashkirs and Bulgarians might be partially descended from the Bulgars, and there might be ethno-cultural influences in Hungarians and Balkars also
- Volga Finns
  - Muromians assimilated by the Russians 12th century.
  - Merya assimilated by the Russians around 1000 AD.
  - Meshchera assimilated by the Russians in the 16th century
- Yurats Samoyed assimilated into Siberian Nenets people in early 19th century.

== Endangered as of 2002 to present ==
- Izhorians 781 members
- Kerek 23 members
- Russko-ustintsy members
- Votes 99 members
- Yaskolbinskie Tatar 3 members
- Kamasins extinction reported in 1989. According to the 2021 Census, population of 21. In 2010, a population of only 2 were reported. Almost all of the Kamasins had assimilated with the Russian peasantry by the early 20th century.
- Yugh people 7 members
  - Yugens
  - Yugis
- Yupik
  - Sirenik language extinction in 1997. This ethnic group, the Sireniks, is no longer enumerated in the census and members and, if surviving, might have changed their identity into another related and larger ethnic group such as Yupik or something completely different.

== Endangered as of 2010 Russian Census ==
- Izhorians 781 members
- Votes 99 members
- Alyutors 96 members
- Kerek 23 members
- Yugh people 7 members

== See also ==
- List of endangered languages in Russia
- Lists of indigenous peoples of Russia
- Lists of endangered languages
- List of languages by time of extinction
- Red Book of Endangered Languages
- Expansion of Russia 1500–1800
- Russian conquest of Siberia
- Russian Colonialism
