= Even language =

Tungusic language

Even
- Lamut, Ewen, Eben, Orich, Ilqan
- эвэды торэн evedy toren
- Native to: Russia
- Region: Russian Far East
- Ethnicity: 21,800 Evens (2010 census)
- Native speakers: 5,700 (2010 census)
- Language family: Tungusic: Northern; Ewenic; Even
- Dialects: Western; Eastern; Arman †
- Writing system: Cyrillic

Language codes
- ISO 639-3: eve
- Glottolog: ewen1234 Even
- ELP: Even
- Linguasphere: 44-CAA-aa
- Even

- Even is classified as Severely Endangered by the UNESCO Atlas of the World's Languages in Danger.

Even, also known as Lamut, Ewen, Eben, Orich, Ilqan (Russian: Эве́нский язы́к, romanized: Evénsky yazýk, historically also Ламутский язы́к, Lamutsky yazýk), is a Tungusic language spoken by the Evens in Siberia. It is spoken by widely scattered communities of reindeer herders from Kamchatka and the Sea of Okhotsk in the east to the Lena river in the west and from the Arctic coast in the north to the Aldan river in the south. Even is an endangered language with only some 5,700 speakers (Russian census, 2010). These speakers are specifically from the Magadan Oblast, the Chukot Autonomous Okrug and the Kamchatka Krai. The now-extinct Arman dialect was highly divergent and may have been a separate language.

In the regions where the Evens primarily reside, the Even language is generally taught in pre-school and elementary school alongside the national language, Russian. Where Even functioned primarily as an oral language for communication between reindeer herding brigades, textbooks began circulating throughout these educational institutions from around 1925 to 1995.

The syntax of the Even language follows the nominative case and subject–object–verb (SOV) word order, with the attribute preceding the dependent member.

== Dialects ==
The dialects are Arman (transitional between Even and Evenki), Indigirka, Kamchatka, Kolyma-Omolon, Okhotsk, Ola, Tompon, Upper Kolyma, Sakkyryr and Lamunkhin. Ola is the literary dialect. The Arman dialect has been extinct since the 1970s.

== Language contact ==
In some remote Arctic villages, such as Russkoye Ustye, whose population descended from Russian-Even intermarriage, the language spoken into the 20th century was a dialect of Russian with a strong Even influence.

== Phonology ==
Vowels
	Front	Central	Back
Close	i iː ɪ ɪː		u uː ʊ ʊː
Mid	e eː	ə əː	o oː ɔ ɔː
Open		a aː	

Consonants
		Labial	Alveolar	Palatal	Velar	Uvular	Glottal
Nasal		m	n	ɲ	ŋ		
Plosive/ Affricate	voiceless	p	t	t͡ʃ	k ~ (q)		
Plosive/ Affricate	voiced	b	d	d͡ʒ	g ~ (ɣ)		
Fricative			s		g ~ (ɣ)		h
Rhotic			r				
Approximant		ʋ ~ w	l	j			

[q], and [ɣ] are allophones of /k/ and /g/, respectively.

== Morphology and syntax ==
Even parts of speech include postpositions, conjunction, particles, and adverbs, as well as nouns and verbs; nouns in Even can function as adjectives and adverbs. Even features a nominative-accusative alignment with subject-object-verb word order. There exists an obligatory copula, but it can be omitted if a noun in the predicate is inflected for the third person.

Nouns in Even are marked for 13 cases, including the nominative, accusative, dative, lative, two forms of the locative, prolative, three forms of the ablative, instrumental, and comitative. They are also inflected for the singular or plural number and for possession, as well as for the subjective, which indicates that the subject noun has no object. Noun inflection is exclusively suffixing. Its pronouns are distinguished between personal, reflexive, and possessive forms, with a distinction between alienable and inalienable forms.

Verbs can be conjugated with prefixes for 15 aspects and feature 6 distinctions in voice, with specific negative and interrogative forms. There are 14 ways to form participles, 8 being transgressives.

== Orthography ==
At present, Even writing functions in Cyrillic. There are three stages in the history of Even writing:

- until the early 1930s, early attempts to create a written language based on the Cyrillic alphabet;
- 1931–1937 – writing on the Latin basis;
- since 1937 – modern writing based on the Cyrillic alphabet.

Modern Even alphabet

А а	Б б	В в	Г г	Д д	Е е	Ё ё	Ж ж	З з
И и	Й й	К к	Л л	М м	Н н	Ӈ ӈ	О о	Ө ө
Ӫ ӫ	П п	Р р	С с	Т т	У у	Ф ф	Х х	Ц ц
Ч ч	Ш ш	Щ щ	Ъ ъ	Ы ы	Ь ь	Э э	Ю ю	Я я

Long vowels are indicated by a macron above the corresponding letter.
