= Besermyan =

Permian ethnic group in Udmurtia, Russia

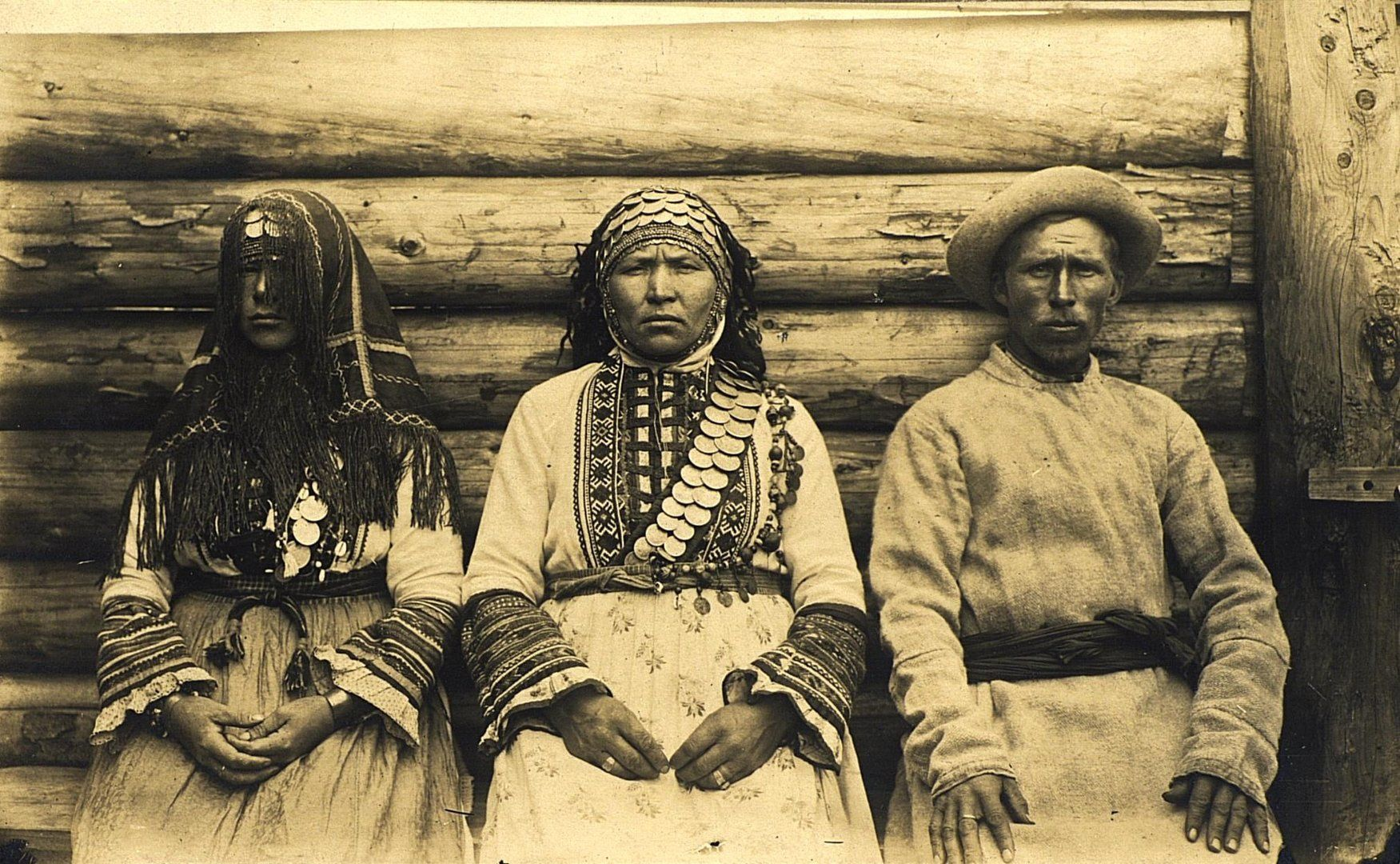

Regions with significant populations
- Udmurtia (Russia)
- Russia: 2,036 (2021)

Languages
- Udmurt (Besermyan dialect)

Religion
- predominantly Sunni Islam, minority Russian Orthodoxy

Related ethnic groups
- Udmurts, Chepetsk Tatars

The Besermyan, Biserman, Besermans, or Besermens, (Note: Russian: бесермяне, besermyane singular: besermyanin, Udmurt: бесерманъёс, Tatar: бисермәннәр, romanized: bisermännär.) are a numerically small Permian people in Russia.

The 1897 Russian census listed 10,800 Besermans. There were 10,000 Besermans in 1926, but the 2002 Russian census found only 3,122 of them.

The Besermyan live in the districts of Yukamenskoye, Glazov, Balezino, and Yar in the northwest of Udmurtia. There are ten villages of pure Besermyan ethnicity in Russia, and 41 villages with a partial Besermyan population.

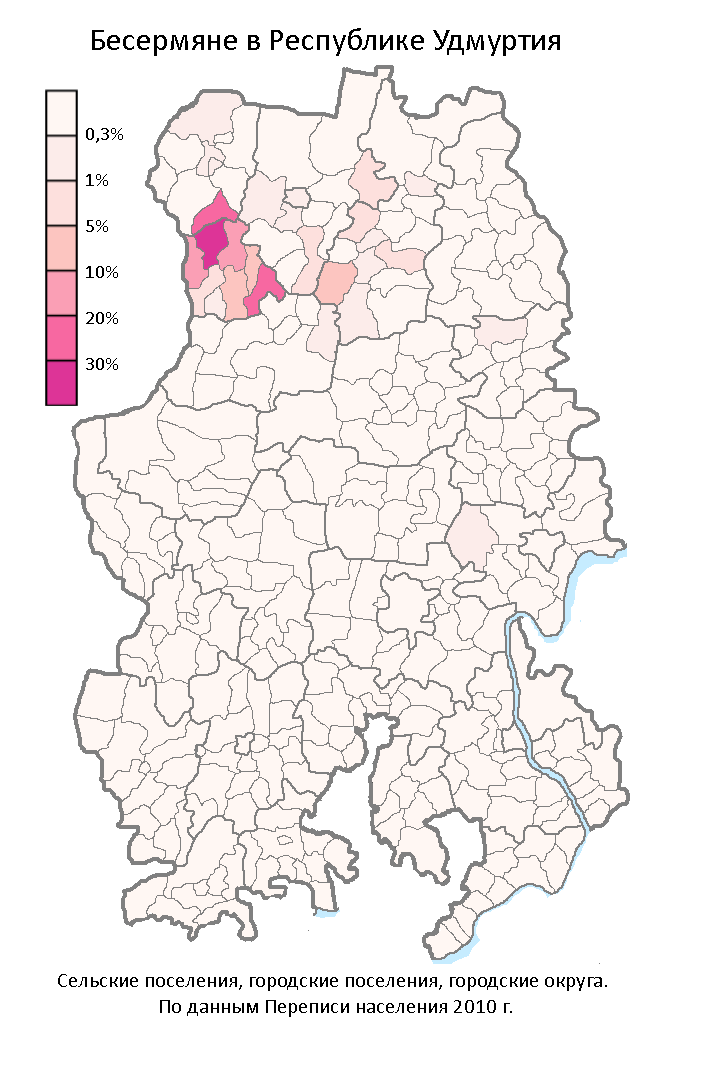
A map of Udmurtia with highlighted regions where the Besermyan live.

== History ==
The Besermyan are of mixed origin, and are probably the result of a group of Tatars who were assimilated by the Udmurts. In the 13th century, during his travel to Mongolia, papal envoy Plano Carpini claimed that the Besermyan were subjects of the Mongols. Russian chronicles sometimes made mention of the Besermyan but it's unclear whether the term was meant to denote the modern group as it was a common derivation of the term "musulman" (Muslim). It is likely that the term had broader usage before it became an ethnonym.

== Culture ==
The language of the Besermyan is a dialect of the Udmurt language with Tatar influences. Although they speak a dialect of Udmurt, the Besermyan consider themselves a distinct people.

The Besermyan used to historically practice their own indigenous religion. According to scholar Shirin Akiner, most current Besermyan practice Sunni Islam. Some Besermyan also practice Christianity. The Russians began converting the Besermyan to Christianity around the middle of the 18th century.

== Genetics ==
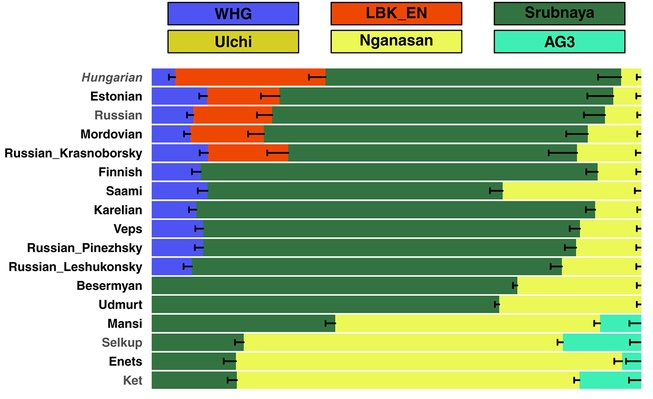
Estimated ancestry components among selected Eurasian populations. The yellow component represents Neo-Siberian ancestry (represented by Nganasans).

In a mtDNA research which was done on Besermyans there were 41 tested persons from the village of Yozhovo in Yukamenskovo raion of Udmurtia. The proportion of Eastern Eurasian haplogroups, primarily of haplogroup C, turned out to be significantly higher than that of the Udmurts. According to this indicator, the Besermyans genetically stand out against the background of the Volga-Ural region and are closer to the Turkic-speaking peoples of Southern Siberia.

A study was conducted of the Y-chromosome haplogroups of 53 Besermyans from the villages of Yukamenskoye and Yozhevo, as well as the village of Shamardan, Yukamensky district of Udmurtia. It turned out that more than half of the samples belong to haplogroup N, which may indicate the predominance of the Finno-Ugric component in the formation of the Besermyans along their male line.

The data from lexicostatistics also did not reveal a noticeable Bulgar (Old Chuvash) substrate in the Besermyan dialect. Only Tatar adstrate, associated with the Chepetsk Tatars, can be traced.

According to a 2019 study, the Besermyan's autosomal genetic admixture can be modeled as two-thirds Srubnaya-like and about one-third Nganasan-like.

== Sources ==
- kominarod.ru: Бесермяне (in Russian)
- "Bisermän". Tatar Encyclopaedia (in Tatar). Kazan: The Republic of Tatarstan Academy of Sciences. Institution of the Tatar Encyclopaedia. 2002.
