= Kereks =

Kerek: aӈӄaлҕaкку

Total population
- 23 (2021 census)

Regions with significant populations
- Russia: 23
- Chukotka: 6
- Samara: 4
- Moscow: 3
- Moscow Oblast: 3

Languages
- Chukchi, Russian, formerly Kerek

Religion
- Shamanism

Related ethnic groups
- other Chukotko-Kamchatkan peoples

Kereks (autonym: aӈӄaлҕaкку, angqalghakku, "seaside people"; Russian: Кереки, romanized: Kereky) are an ethnic group of people in Russia. In the 2021 census, only 23 people registered as ethnic Kereks in Russia. According to the 2010 census, there were only 4, and according to the 2002 census, there were 8 people registered as Kereks. According to the 1897 census, there were still 102 Kereks. During the twentieth century, Kereks were almost completely assimilated into the Chukchi people.

In 2024, Ukrainian media reported that "one of the last members of the Kerek people" had died; furthermore, he "was killed in action on the Kursk front of the Russo-Ukrainian War. But later reporting indicated the soldier's obituary was a fake, and a photo of another Russian soldier from Buryatia, who died in the war with Ukraine, was used for the grave photo.

== Language ==
Their traditional language is the Kerek language, but it is no longer spoken. Kerek descendants speak Chukchi and Russian. The Kerek language, which belongs to the Chukchi–Kamchatka family (it is included in Paleoasiatic languages), is close to the Koryak language and is often considered a dialect of the latter.

== Lifestyle ==
Historically, the Kerek were a settled people who engaged in fishing and hunting of wild deer and mountain sheep. Southern Kereks also practiced small-scale reindeer herding. They also kept sled dogs and collected fur from marine mammals.

Shamanism and animism was strong among the Kerek, with the Kerek never converting to Christianity.
