= Aghul people =

Ethnic group in Dagestan, Russia

Aghuls
агулар
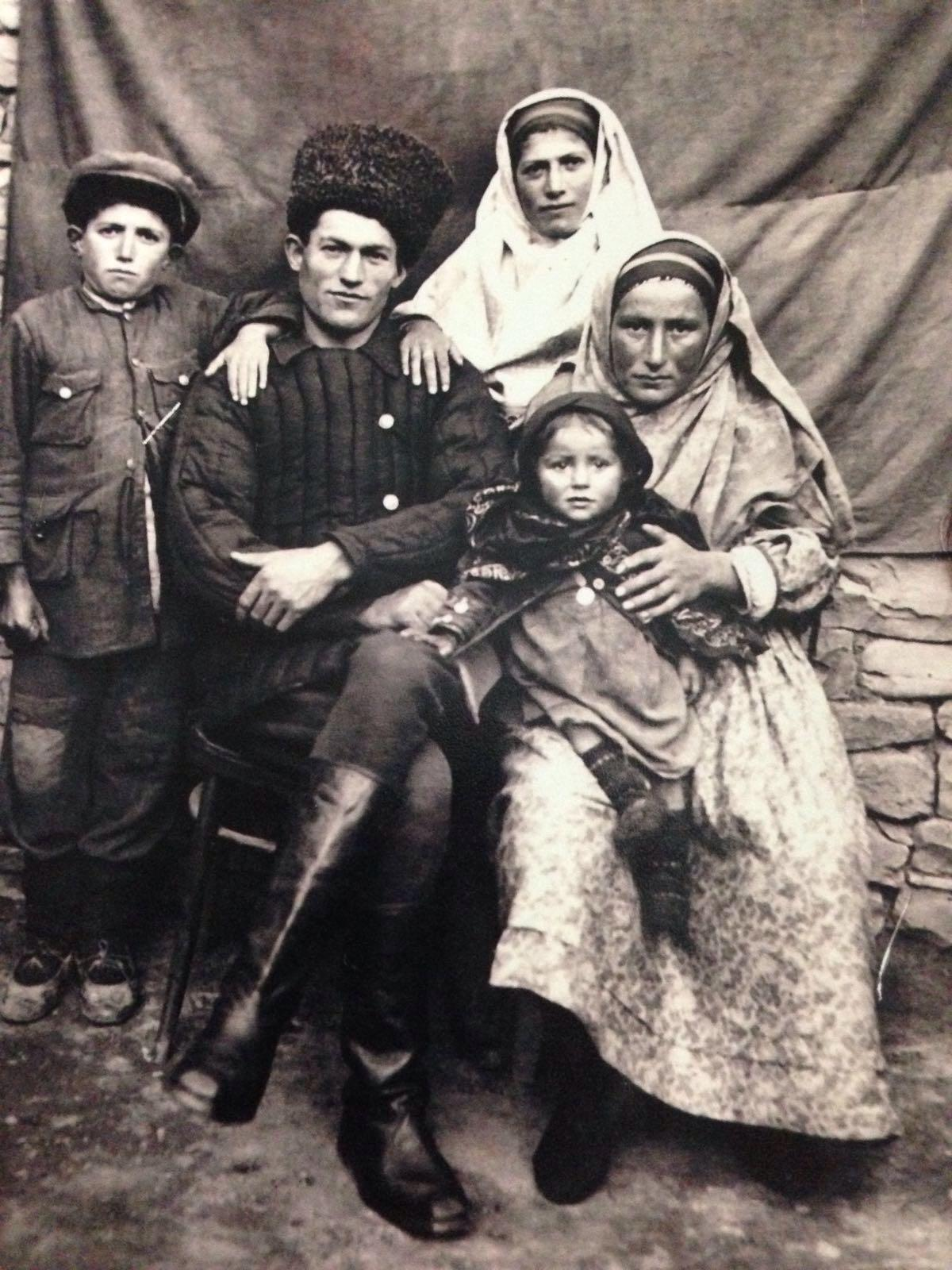

Total population
- 45,000

Regions with significant populations
- Russia: Dagestan 23,314: 34,576
- Ukraine: 108
- Latvia: 25 or 33

Languages
- Aghul, Russian

Religion
- predominately Sunni Islam

Related ethnic groups
- Other Lezgic peoples

Aghuls (Aghul: агулар, romanized: agular,) are a Northeast Caucasian ethnic group native predominantly to Agulsky district of Dagestan, partly on the plain and in cities (Dagestanskiye Ogni, Derbent, Makhachkala, etc.). According to the 2010 census, there were 34,160 Aghuls in Russia (7,000 in 1959). The Aghul language belongs to the Lezgic language family, a group of the Northeast Caucasian family. Ethnically, the Aghuls are close to the Lezgins. There are four groups of the Aghul people, who live in four different gorges: Aguldere, Kurakhdere, Khushandere, and Khpyukdere. Like their neighbors the Kaitags, the Aghuls were converted to Islam at a fairly early date, subsequent to the Arab conquest of the eighth century.

== Culture ==
As elsewhere in Daghestan, the Aghuls were divided into tukhums (clans), comprising twenty to forty households. Each tukhum had its own cemetery, pastures, and hay fields, and the members were bound by obligations of mutual support and defense.

Each Aghul village had a village council, on which each of the three or four tukhums were represented. The council was headed by an elder. The village mullah and qadi also played an important role in local affairs. In some cases the wealthier tukhums exerted a disproportionate strong influence on village government.

The Aghuls tended to practice endogamy within the tukhum—marriages with outsiders were very rare. In the past the Aghuls lived in extended family households, though not especially large ones (fifteen to twenty members, on average). A senior male, father or eldest brother, functioned as chief, with fairly broad authority over the affairs of the household and its members. Should the extended family split up, sisters—even those who had already married and left the household—received a portion of the land as well as the movable property. They were each apportioned one-half of the land share given to each of their brothers, a practice that was unusually generous by Daghestanian standards.
