= Solon language =

Dialect of the Evenki language

Solon
- Suolun, Solong, Sulong, Haila’er Evenki
- ewenke, 索伦, suǒlún
- Native to: China
- Region: Inner Mongolia, Heilongjiang and Xinjiang
- Ethnicity: 20,000-25,000 Solons
- Native speakers: 20,000 (2020)
- Language family: Tungusic: Northern; Ewenic; Evenki group; Evenki; Manchurian Evenki; Solon
- Dialects: Amur Solon; Hulun Buir Solon; Morigele; Nonni Solon; Ongkor Solon †
- Writing system: Latin, Mongolian

Language codes
- ISO 639-3: None (mis)
- Glottolog: solo1263
- ELP: Solon
- Linguasphere: 44-CAA-bc
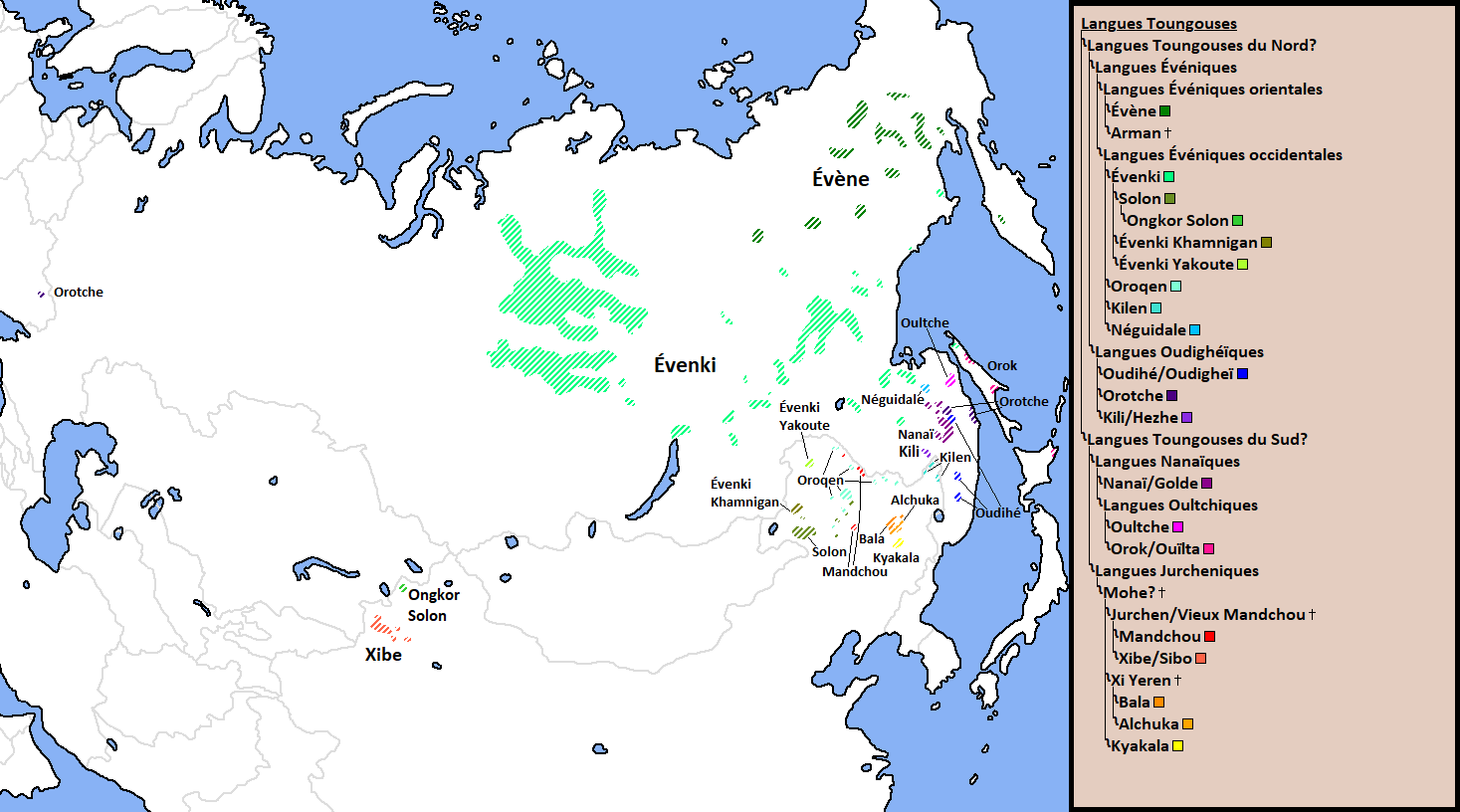
- Map of the Tungusic languages. Solon

- Solon is classified as Definitely Endangered by the UNESCO Atlas of the World's Languages in Danger.

Solon is a language or dialect descended from Tungusic that was spoken by the Solons in China. Solon is a Manchurian Evenki dialect that was created when Solons were relocated from the Upper and Middle Amur basin to Hulunbuir during the 17th century and specifically the 1650s. The Solon language is mainly concentrated in the Ewenki Autonomous Banner in Inner Mongolia, which was previously named the Solon Banner until 1958.

== Name ==
The term "Solon" is believed to have come from the Evenki word sologon, which means 'upstream inhabitant', with solo- defined as 'to go upstream'. Solon was originally used for Evenki and Dagur speakers from the Amur valley and was probably used when the Solons were formed as distinct from the Evenki. After migrations in the 16th-17th century from multiple ethnic groups, the name Solon was used for modern Solon, Dagur and Oroqen speakers. After being moved to Hulunbuir in 1732, the modern Solons and Solon dialect were designated and distinguished from other ethnic groups.

Solons were also called Ongkors, which has been changed to designate Solons from Xinjiang and their dialect. The Chinese name for the Solon language is the 海拉尔, Hǎilā'ěr (Hailar) dialect of Evenki.

The Solons call themselves the "Ewenke", which is the term also used by China for the entire Ewenke minority groups that include the Khamnigan Evenki and the Aoluguya Evenki. When conversing with Nargil, Solons state that Ewenke refers to Solon, and the other Ewenke minority groups should have a modifier for their names to disgtinguish those groups from Solon.

== Dialects ==
Glottolog states that the dialects of Solon are Amur, Hulun Buir (Huihe), Morigele, Nonni (Nenjiang) and Ongkor Solon. Piispanen states the Solon dialects are Huihe, Hailar/Bouthka, Orončo, Manegir, Onkor/Xinjian and Turkestan Solon, with the latter 2 most likely being an identical dialect.

There is also a different grouping for the Solon's dialects that are made up of 3 different dialect groups, Hailar, Nonni and Ongkor Solon. The Hailar dialect has been significantly influenced by Mongolic, while the Nonni dialect has been significantly influenced by Chinese and Dagur. The Nonni dialect is considered to be more endangered due to its worse preservation.

The Ongkor Solon dialect has been classified as it's own separate language in the past by linguists such as Jiro Ikegami, who classified Manchurian Solon and Ongkor Solon as separate languages in the Ewenkian group. The Ongkor Solon dialect has been extinct since the 1990s.

== Classification ==
According to Juha Janhunen's research, the numerous dialects of the Ewenki language can be divided into two major groups: those of the Solons (which he labels "Solon Ewenki") and those of the Ewenki of Siberia (as well as the Oroqen and the "Manchurian Reindeer Tungus" of China), which he calls "Siberian Evenki". Solon is mutually unintelligable with the other Evenki dialects. The Ewenki dialects of the bilingual Khamnigan show features characteristic of both "Manchurian" and "Siberian" groups, as well as peculiar Khamnigan innovations.

The Solon being closely associated with the Dagur, many (around half of them, according to Janhunen's field research in the 1990s) Solon people are bilingual in the Dagur. Historically, it was falsely believed by Leopold von Schrenck that Dagur was classified with Solon as their own separate tetrachotomic group for Tungusic.

Valentin Avrorin has also classified Negidal with Solon as language connected with Even, Evenki and Samagir in a Northern Tungusic branch. Gerhard Doerfer also continued to separate the branch from Avrovin with Solon becoming a part of the Northwestern Tungusic languages with Evenki, Oroqen and Negidal.

During the Qing Empire, many Solon (as well as members of many other native groups of Manchuria) were able to speak Manchu, while in modern China Mandarin Chinese is universally taught.

Solon has also been classified as a separate language as it is archaic, atypical and has had a strong influence from neighbouring languages like Manchu and Dagur. Juha Janhunen classifies Solon as a part of the Ewenic languages. Nargil has classified Solon and its dialects as a Manchurian Ewenic group with Khamnigan Evenki that is separated from the rest of the Ewenic languages.

Malcolm Ross proposed the term "lect" in 2001 to not distinguish between Solon being a dialect or language due to the difficulty of its classification.

== Status ==
Solon is considered the most vital Tungusic language. According to UNESCO's Atlas of the World's Languages in Danger, Solon is classified as a language definitely endangered. Juha Janhunen and Toshiro Tsumagari classified Solon as endangered, with the language being nearly extinct locally.

Solon is considered the most vital Tungusic language. Solons generally also have a positive attitude towards their languages and culture, with the language being used in everyday activities.

Solons access to education in Mongolian or Mandarin as well as TV and social media has resulted in many Solons being bilingual or even trilingual. Solons also potentially due to their close interactions, have some levels of proficiency with Dagur, Khamnigan Evenki and Oroqen, although this is rarer for the younger generations. Some Solon speakers also have learnt English, Japanese and Russian, although these are even rarer and are considered foreign languages.

Currently, urbanisation has resulted in challenges with the language being maintained as Solon speakers leaving rural areas have their language become socially disadvantaged. However, in general, a majority of Solons only speak Solon commonly, which is different between older and younger generations that have only 45.9% of younger Solons only speak Solon commonly.

In rural Solon areas, Solon children are able to speak Solon fluently, Han Chinese and Mongols living in these Solon rural regions learn basic sentences of Solon to talk to Solons.

=== Population ===
According to Juha Janhunen and Toshiro Tsumagari, the language currently has approximately 15,000 speakers. In 2010, Christopher Moseley stated that there were 10,000 speakers.

However, Nargil states that in the 2020 census, there are 20,000 Solon speakers, which are up from 8,700 speakers in 1964 and 17,500 speakers in 1982. From the 20,000 speakers in 2020, 10,000 come from the Ewenki Autonomous Banner, 4,900 speakers from the Morin Dawa Daur Autonomous Banner, 2,200 speakers from the Arun Banner, 2,200 speakers from the Oroqen Autonomous Banner, 2,000 speakers from Hailar and 1,200 speakers from Zalantun. In the Ewenki Autonomous Banner, the Solon account for 7% of the population, which is lower in urban areas where Mandarin and Mongolian are more commonly used.

=== Conservation ===
The Ewenke Autonomous Banner's government holds events that promote Solon identity and language that include festivals and school activities. There were various policies and organisations created for the protection of Solon, that includes the Ewenke Study Association, the Ewenke Language Centre and the Ewenke Language Tutorial that introduced a Latin script, have adopted weekly education programs including a curriculum for schools and televised an animated series and an TV program in Solon.

== Phonology ==
=== Consonants ===
Tsumagari states there are 17 consonant phonemes in the Solon language, which are p, t, k, b, d, g, m, n, c, tʃ, j, dʒ, s, x, l, r, w, y and [j]. The /h/ phoneme is also sometimes considered a separate phoneme, but is also interpreted as an allophone of s. However, Kazama states there are 19 consonant phonemes, that are p, t, č, k, b, d, ǰ, g, m, n, ň, ŋ, s, š, x, w, j, r and l. Baek also states that there are 17 consonants, which are m, n, ŋ, b, d, j, g, p, t, c, k, s, x, w, y, l and r. The following table shows all of the consonants Solon uses.

Solon consonants
		Labial	Dental	Palatal	Retroflex	Alveolar	Post- alveolar	Velar	Glottal
Nasal		m	n	ɲ				ŋ	
Plosive	voiceless	p	t	c			tʃ	k	
Plosive	voiced	b	d				dʒ	ɡ	
Fricative		f			ʂ	s		x	h
Approximant		w	l	ɥ		r	j		

=== Vowels ===
Kazama states there are 12 vowel phonemes in the Solon language, which are H, i, ə, ɵ, u, S, ι, a, o, u, e and ee. However, Baek states there are 9 vowels, that are u, i, ʊ, ɪ, ɵ, e, o, iě and a. The following table shows all of the vowels Solon uses.

Solon vowels
	Front		Central	Back	
	unrounded	rounded	rounded	unrounded	rounded
Close	i, iː		ʉ, ʉː		u, uː
Near-close		ɪ			ʊ
Mid	e, eː		ɵ, ɵː	ə, əː	o, oː
Open	a, aː				

=== Syllable structure ===
The syllable structure of Solon is shown as (C)V(V)(C).

== Morphology ==
=== Morphological process ===
Solon's morphological process has agglutinative suffixes, which is shown in the xaxraa-sül-nii-s (of your chickens). Regressive assimilation has also occurred in Solon, resulting in alterations in the stem's final consonant, which is shown in is-ca being used for has reached over it-caa.

=== Nouns ===
==== Declension ====
Solon has 13 different cases that includes an established genitive and an unmarked nominative form that serves as a stem of oblique cases. Some case-endings in Solon also include allomorphs which include the stem-final phonemic structure (-V♯/-C♯). The following list includes the Solon words beye (man) and morin (horse) that comes from Toshiro Tsumagari.

Case	beye (man)	morin (horse)
Nominative	beye	morin
Genitive	beye-nii	morin-ii
Accusative	beye-we	morin-ba
Indefinite Accusative	beye-ye	morin-a
Dative	beye-dii	morin-du
Locative	beye-lee	morin-dulaa
Directive	beye-txii	morin-tixii
Prolative	beye-lii	morin-dulii
Ablative	beye-diixi	morin-duxi
Elative	beye-giiji	morin-giiji
Delative	beye-leexi	morin-dulaaxi
Instrumental	beye-ji	morin-ji
Comitative	beye-gilii	morin-gilii

==== Personal endings ====
The following list includes the nominative form and other case forms in Solon with endings that indicate the person and their number, which comes from Toshiro Tsumagari.

	Singular	Plural
1st person	-bi［-beye～-weye]	-mun～-mün (exclusive) -t(i) (inclusive)
2nd person	-s(i) (～C-ci)	-sun～-sün (～C-cun～-cün)
3rd person	-nin(i)［-ni	same as singular
Reflexive	［-bi～-wi]	［-beli～-weli］

==== Plural suffix ====
Plurality in Solon is represented by the suffix -sal, which is attached to humans, animals and innaminate objects such as omolƐƐ -sal (grandsons), xolƐƐ -sal/＜xolƐƐn (snakes) and jolo-sol (stones). Unmarked forms are also used for referring to plural entities, which is more common when there is a quantitative adjective or it is preceded by a numeral such as ilan iite (three sons) and baraan xonin (many sheep). The suffix -sƐƐn is also added in Solon to place names or personal names and will mean "those who live somewhere" and "someoneʼs family, someone and others", which is shown by imin-sƐƐn (those who live in Imin) and ülji-sƐƐn (the Uljis). The noun ulur or possibly olor (people, fellow) has also been used in Solon for human nouns such as sawi ulur (students).

=== Pronouns ===
==== Personal pronouns ====
Most of the personal pronouns in Solon are infected with alternative stems given in square brackets. The case-endings are similar to the noun case-endings, with the restructuring of actual occurrence for case-endings. For 3rd person pronouns, demonstrative pronouns such as eri/tari (this/that), usually employs plural forms ersel/tarsal～taccil (these/those) and elür/talur (＜eri/tari ulur) (these/those people). The original 3rd person pronoun nugan, with a plural form of nugan-sal, is rarely used and expresses politeness to the referent. This is shown in the following table, that comes from Toshiro Tsumagari.

	Singular	Plural
1st person	bii ［min-,accusative case minewe]	büü［mün-,accusative case münewe (exclusive) miti (inclusive)
2nd person	sii ［sin-,accusative case sinewe]	süü［sün-,accusative case sünewe］

==== Reflexive pronouns ====
The word meeni (oneself) is used for both numbers and has the stem meen-, a case-ending and a singular reflexive-ending. The word meeni has a dative case of meen-dü-wi, an instrumental case of meen-ji-wi and an accusative case of meen-bi, with the accusative case not having and any case-markings.

==== Demonstrative pronouns ====
The words eri (this) and tari (that) are used attributively and independently, with some case forms having both having reduced stems and derivative forms. The case forms with reduced stems are the dative case of e-dü/ta-du and the locative case of e-lee/ta-laa, while the derivative forms are eyye/tayya (this/that with a contemptuous tone), ennegen/tannagan (like this/that which is attributive) and ettü/tattu (in this/that way).

==== Interrogative pronouns ====
The following table includes interrogative pronouns from Toshiro Tsumagari:

English	Solon
what	ii, oxon
who	aawu, nii
which	iir, iggü
how many, how much	ooxi, adi

The following table also includes interrogative pronouns from Toshiro Tsumagari which have some case forms and derivative forms serve as interrogative adverbs.

English	Solon
when	ooxidu
where	iilee
how	iittü
why, how	yoodon
what kind of	oondii

=== Adjectives ===
==== Conversion ====
Adjectives in Solon are converted into nouns instead of having inflections and take number, case and personal markings, as shown by nisüxün-sel-we-ni (the small ones). Conversion or adding instrumental case-endings could also change the adjectives function to be an adverb, as shown by sii ayaxan/ayaxan-ji aasin-caa-si-gii? (Did you sleep well?).

==== Derivation ====
In Solon, there is an adjective suffix -si, which means having/with, could and sometimes has a semantic change. The following table includes Solon's words with the suffix -si and in both Solon and English from Toshiro Tsumagari.

Words	Words with suffix -si
mügün (money)	mügün-si (having money, rich)
antan (taste)	antan-si (ʻtasteful, delicious, sweet)
naalla (hand)	naalla-si (crafty)

The addition of different suffixes could change the semantic differences of words such as aya (good), which can be changed into aya-xan (rather good, healthy), aya-xaya (almost good) and aya-kkan (very good).

==== Reduplication ====
A partial reduplication is employed in Solon for an emphatic expression, almost exactly the way it is expressed in Mongolic and Turkic, while also being similar to Chinese Tungusic, but not Russian Tungusic. This is shown with ab aya (very good), xob xonnorin (coal-black) and nem nemikkün (very thin).

Adjectives for colours also include another type of reduplication that combines with suffixation. This is shown in siŋarin (yellow), siŋa siŋa-ljaxun (deep yellow), ularin (red), ula ulari-ljaxun (deep red).

=== Numerals ===
==== Cardinals ====
The following table includes the Solon's words for numerals from Toshiro Tsumagari and Shinjiro Kazama.

Number	Solon
1	əmun/emün
2	ǰuur/jüür
3	ilan
4	digin
5	tuŋa/toŋa
6	niŋun/niŋün
7	nadan
8	ǰaxun
9	jəgin/yegin
10	ǰaan
11	jaan emün
12	jaan jüür
20	orin
30	gotin
40	dexi
50	toŋŋεε/tornii
60	niŋüŋŋεε/niŋürnii
70	nadanŋŋεε/nadanrnii
80	jaxuŋŋεε/jaxurnii
90	yereen
100	namaaji
200	jüür namaaji
1,000	miŋgan
10,000	tümün

The numerals 20, 30, 40, 90, 1,000 and 10,000 (orin, gotin, dexi, yereen, miŋgan and tümün) are shown to be borrowed from Manchu (orin, γusin, dexi, and tumen) and Mongolian (χorin, γucin, yiren, miŋgan, tümen).

==== Derivative numerals ====
Ordinal numerals have the suffix -si/-ci added to them, such as ila-si. Manchu supplementive forms are also adopted for first "üjü" (＜Ma. uju ʻid.＜head) and second "jai" (＜Ma.jai ʻid.＜next).

The following is derivational suffixes of Solon from Toshiro Tsumagari.

Case	Suffix
Iterative	-raa
Collective	-nnεε
Distributive	-tal
Restrictive	-xxan

=== Verbs ===
==== Derivation verbs ====
Derivational suffixes are used in verb stems in Solon to change the primary stem's meaning, which includes its voice. The following table includes Solon's suffix's used as verb stems in Solon words with the English translation from Toshiro Tsumagari.

Suffix name	Suffix	Example in Solon and English
Passive	-wu～-guu	jawa-wu (to be held)
Causative	-xaan	eme-xeen (to make someone come)
Reciprocal	-ldi	jawa-ldi (to grasp each other)
Reciprocal	-maasi	taa-maasi (to pull each other)
Progressive	-ji	imanda-ji (to be snowing)
Purposive	-naa	jawa-naa (to go to catch)
Regressive	-rgi	eme-rgi (to come back)
Optative	-muun	jeb--müün (to want to eat)

==== Conjugation ====
In Solon, various verb-endings are added to inflect the verbs. This is divided into four functions, which are imperative endings, final endings, particle endings and converb endings.

==== Imperative forms ====
Solon's imperative forms include 1st, 2nd and 3rd person forms, while also having a tense distinction between present and future forms, with future forms also having a postponed realization. The following table by Toshiro Tsumagari depicts this.

	Present imperative forms			Future imperative forms		
	singular	plural		singular	plural	
	singular	exclusive	inclusive	singular	exclusive	inclusive
1st person	-gati/-kti	-gati-mun	-gaari	-duuni	-daa-mun	-daa-weli
2nd person	-xa	-xa-ldun		-daa-wi	-daa-sun	
3rd person	-gini	-gini		-daa-ni	-daa-ni	

==== Final forms ====
In Solon, final forms that have their verb-terms end with n, modifications that include an a～e link-vowel is added. The following table contains the final forms by Toshiro Tsumagari that includes the words jawa- (to hold) and aasin- (to sleep).

	singular	plural	
	singular	exclusive	inclusive
1st person	jawa-mi aasin-ami	jawa-mun aasin-amun	jawa-tti aasin-ati
2nd person	jawa-ndi aasin-andi	jawa-sun aasin-asun	
3rd person	jawa-ran aasin-an	jawa-ran aasin-an	

==== Particle forms ====
Particle forms in Solon have three syntactically different functions, which are attributes of nouns, a verbal-noun that could potentially take a case-ending and a predicate for both future and past tense. Ending could also take personal markers, which is the same as the nominal possessive marker, but doesn't have a 3rd person marking. The following table contains the particle forms by Toshiro Tsumagari.

	singular	plural	
	singular	exclusive	inclusive
1st person	-w	-mun	-ti
2nd person	-si	-sun	

==== Converb forms ====
Converbs in Solon are modifiers of main verbs in complex sentences. Converbs could require personal marking of the doer, while other converbs have no personal ending. The following table contains the different types of converb in Solon with their suffixes by Toshiro Tsumagari.

Suffix name	Suffix	English
Coordinative converb	-mi	(with) - -ing
Subordinative converb	-kci ～ -cci	after - -ing
Perfective converb	-taan(i)	after finishing -
Durative converb	-gii	after/while - -ing many times
Conditional converb	-kki	if, when -
Successive converb	-jixi, -jixaa	just after, as soon as -

There is also a converb form of bi- (to be) or oo- (to become, to do) that some Solon particles originate from. In conjunctiveparticle, subordinative converbs for each verbs are employed, as shown with exin oocci axin (elder sister and elder brother) and imin doo-nii müü-nin aruxxun bicci antasi (The water of Imin river is clear and sweet). The conditional converb of bi- also has a topic particle bikki(wi) (as for) originate from it with a reflexive marker as shown by tari doo-nii gebbi-nin bikkiwi imin doo gün-en (The name of the river is called Imin river).

==== Auxiliary verbs ====
Auxiliaries are employed in Solon verbs are used to analytically express aspectual, modal and other meanings after conjugational forms for verbs. An example would be the verb bi with past forms such as bi-see (remote past) and üli-cee bi-see ((He) has already gone), the future form of ga-jiguu bi-see (I might have taken) and the coordinative converb of aasi-mi bi-see ((He) was (still) sleeping). Auxiliaries also are employed in the verbs oo- with the coordinative converb ebbesi-mi oo-dan (ʻ(It is) possible/permitted/expected to swim), nee- (ʻto lay, keep) with subordinative converbs xorii-cci nee-see ((They) have arrested (him)) and ommo-cci nee-süü (ʻI have forgotten), büü- (to give) with the coordinative converb irda-mi büü-xe (Comb my hair for me!) and isi- (to see) with the coordinative converb ji-mi isi-xe (Try to eat!).

== Script ==
Historically, Solon has never had a literary form. In the 1980s, standardisation of the language had started, which included the creation of a script system based on the Mongolian script. In 2005, the Ewenke Study Association started to use Latin as a script for researchers and Solons, but this has not been adopted by Solon community. Currently Solon can be recording using the Latin, Manchu, or the Mongolian script, although it still remains virtually unwritten as it lacks a commonly accepted orthography. Tsumagari also states that the Manchu script is no longer used, while Solons, when applying a script, usually employ a Mongolian or a Chinese script.

== Loanwords ==
=== Mongolic ===
==== Dagur ====
Both Solon and Dagur have strongly influenced each other linguistically due to both ethnic groups living near each other. Solons speak Dagur as a second language and approximately 100 words in Solon could be directly attributed to Solon. There are hundreds of Dagur loanwords in Solon, which include xaxraa (chicken) and düsee (wall).

==== Mongolian ====
Mongolian loanwords in Solon are difficult to separate from Dagur loanwords due to Mongolian counterpart words in Dagur and the influence Dagur has on Solon. The comitative case-ending -tai is adapted from Mongolian into the quasi-comitative case-ending of -tεε, which includes ninixin-tεε-wi (with oneʼs own dog). The word yeeme widely used Mongolian loanword in Solon that either is meant as an expletive noun or a final particle in a sentence. Other Mongolian loanwords in Solon include ajil (work), bitig (book), aduun (herd of horses) and amidral (life).

==== Khalkha ====
In the grammaticalization of Solon's generic verb of speech, Khalkha loanwords through contact-induced changes. Verbs such as kun- are loanwords used in Solon as a context of quotation. The Solon suffix -mi that is marked to future elements also has the suffix -an in Khalkha that are linked together through generic verbs of speech and contact between languages. This is shown by Nargil with the Solon sentence tʰɔːtʃʰi tʃuː-riː alaːr pʊxa-wal im-ʊː-naː-mi kun-kʰəŋ ul-tʃʰə kunəŋ. (It is said that then they two left in order to make their spotty bull drink), which is compared and similar to the Khalkha sentence aaw oroi ažl-aas=aa ömön xüŋ-tei uulz-an ge-ed ɢar-saŋ baix. (Father probably went out in the evening before his work to meet someone.)

==== Rotacism ====
As in Dagur, Solon has the Mongolic consonants b, g, d and s be replaced by the consonant r. The following table shows words from Solon, Dagur and other Mongolic languages that depict this consonant replacement and consonants from other Mongolic languages.

English	Solon	Dagur	Literary Mongolian	Buryat	Khamnigan Mongol	Khalkha
threshold	basarga/basagga	basarga	bosoγ-a	bogoho	bosoga	bosgo
to break	erde-	erde-/erede-	ebde-	ebde-		ewde-
people, nation	olur	olor	ulus	ulad	ulus	uls
chopsticks	sarpa	sarpa/sarepe	sabq-a	sabxa	sabka	sawx
devil	širkül	širkul/šurkul	čidkür	šüdxer	čidkür	čötgör
to squeeze	xarči-	karči-	qabči-	xabša-		xawči-
bowstring	xürči	kürči	köbči	xübše	kübtši	xöwč
to break, chop, split	sarči-		čábči-	sabša-	tsabtši-	cawči-
gelding	aktā	arta	aγta	agta		agt(an)
jerboa, jumping mouse	alaγdã	alardān	alaγdaγ-a	alag dāgan		alagdāga
tale	üliger	urgil	üliger	ül'ger		ülger

==== Ü and U ====
As in Dagur, Solon has changes in the vowels ö and o, which is changed into ü and u for both languages. The following table shows words from Solon, Dagur and other Mongolic languages that depict this vowel change with other Mongolic languages that also depict this change.

English	Solon	Dagur	Literary Mongolian	Buryat	Khamnigan Mongol	Khalkha
scum on boiled milk	ürüm	urum	örüme	ürme		öröm
orphan	ünči	unčin	önöcin	ünšen		öncin
hunchbacked; horse croup	büktür	bükütür	bökötü	büxe		böx
stirrup	dürēñki	dürēngi	dörüge		dürȫ	dörȫ(n)
rebirth	türül	türe-	töröl < törö-	türe		törö
saddle girth	ulam		olom	ulam	olom	olom
wrestler	büxü		böke	büxe		böx

==== Mongolic initial H ====
In Solon, the Middle Mongolic initial h- is found that was also preserved in Dagur, which is also different to the other Tungusic languages too. There are also other Mongolic loanwords that replace the initial h- with the long vowel ō and removed the vowel i. The following table depicts this from Solon, Dagur and other Mongolic languages that depict this vowel changes.

English	Solon	Dagur	Literary Mongolian	Buryat	Khamnigan Mongol	Khalkha
gadfly	ilā	hilā	ilay-a	ilāhan	ilāxun	yalā
red	ulān	hulān	ulaγan			ulān
to bless	irügē	šurē-	irüge-	yürȫ-		yerȫ-
origin	oǰōr	hoǰōr	iǰaγur	izagūr		yazgūr

==== Mongolic intervocalic VGV ====
In Solon, there are loanwords from Mongolic languages that contain the intervocalic VGV that Modern Mongolic languages replaced with a long vowel that supposedly originated from early Dagur borrowings. There are also some Solon words that did replace the long vowel such as the AGU ~ UGU sequence developing into ō and the sequence aγu developing into the diphthong au. The following table depicts this sequence changes from Solon and Mongolic languages.

English	Solon	Dagur	Literary Mongolian	Buryat	Khamnigan Mongol	Khalkha
abrasion; saddle sore	dagari	dāri	daγari	dāri		dair
clavicle	egem		egem	ēm		egem
saddle	emegēl	emēl	emegel		emegēl	emēl
camel	temegẽ	temē	temegen		temegēn	temē(n)
cow	ünigẽ	unyē	üniyen	ünyēn	ünie	ünē(n)
gray horse, hoary	bōral	bōral	buγural ~ buγurul		borºl	būral
bustard	xorgōl	xorgōl	γurγuul			gurgūl
what	yō	yō	yaγun			yūn
young	ǰalō	ǰalō	ǰalaγu		dzalā	zalū
song	dō	dau	daγu		dō	dū
steam	ōr	aur	aγur			ūr
riddle	tāūl	tāuli	taγaburi	tābari		tāwar
partridge	itau		itaγu	itag [šāzgai]		yatū

==== Intervocalic S ====
In Solon, the initial and intervocalic position s comes from a change from the Mongolic č. The following table depicts this sequence changes from Solon and Mongolic languages.

English	Solon	Dagur	Literary Mongolian	Buryat	Khamnigan Mongol	Khalkha	Mongolic
lightning	saxil	čakilgān	čakilγan	saxilgān		caxilgān	čaki-l
paper	sāsū	čās	čaγasun		čārxu(n)	cās(an)	
shirt	sanča	čanči	čamča	samsa	tsamtsa	camc(an)	
temple (body part)	soxo	čoko	čoqo	soxo	čoku ~ tsoxo	cox	
branch of a tree	asa		ača	asa		ac	
to investigate, check	baisa-	baičā-	bayičaγa-	baisā-		baicā-	
sacrum	ūsa		uγuča	ūsa	ūts	ūc	
limb of the body	müsü		möče	müse		möč	

==== Consonant (V)N ====
Solon's consonants changed originally from -(V)n to a secondary long nasal vowel similarly to Mongolic languages. The following table depicts this consonant change with Solon and other Mongolic languages.

English	Solon	Dagur	Literary Mongolian	Buryat	Khamnigan Mongol	Khalkha
gold	altā̃		alta(n)	alta(n)	altan	alt(an)
virtue	buyā̃	boyin	buyan			buyan
blacksmith; craftsman	darxā̃	darxan	darqan			darxan
wise	mergē̃	mergen	mergen	merge(n)		mergen
truth	ūnē̃	unen	ünen			ünen

==== Piispanen (2019) ====
The following table contains Solon words with their Dagur loanwords which include Solon's dialects and English.

English	Solon	Dagur	Ongkor Solon	Turkestan Solon	Manegir Solon	Orončo Solon	Bouthka Solon
badger	eveer	heveer					
pupil	anaxāā ~ anaxā̃ ~ anahāā	haneekaa					
ox	e̮ggē̮l	ergel	e̮rge̮l	ergel			
fence; palisade; garden	xe̮rǯē̮	kerǯee	e̮rge̮l	ergel			
to close, to shut; to lock, to block	axu- ~ ahu-	haagu	axume	axu-			
pile	dɯi̭l	dujl					
to move slowly	hurbelgu	gɯrge̮lbɯ̄-	gu̇rgu̇lıme	gurgule-			
plate	ilā	hilaa					
swan	otćēl	xorseel					
to shave, to plan, to scrape	xandā- ~ handā-	xandaa-	xandāme	xanda-	xannáran		
teapot	sāxā ~ sāhā	čaaxu ~ čaaxuu					
pelvic bone	sē̮ći	seuǯ					
basket	sē̮lčē̮	čeelčee ~ čäälčää					
grape; Asian hazel; hazelnuts	sɯćɯ̄	čučuu ~ čučug					
juice	sɯ̄rče̮	čuus					
wooden cup	taŋur	taŋguraa				tuaŋará	
sour crème	śiŋe̮e̮	šiŋgee					
to light a lamp	teŋki-	teŋkeegu-					
piglet	ǯilčx̌ā̃ ~ ǯiléxāā	žalžaha					
to be obstinate, to abut, to resist	ǯir-	šeergu-					
paper box; case, chest		neem ~ nääm			némo		
armor; shell	sarxi ~ sarki	kuajr sark’					
pumpkin		veegee					yogé
cattle; big livestock		aduus	adǝ̑sūn	adsṇ			
to meet	ōlži-	auldži-	adǝ̑sūn	auldi-			
lark	ōlži-	beldur	bⁱāldur	b’aldur			
letter; certificate; book	bite̮g ~ bitig	biteg ~ bitäg	bitik	b’itix	bityɣé ~ bitxe		
saucer, plate		d’aas	di̭as	d’ase, d’aze	déza		
pink		kauvu	xaṷgu	xaūg ~ xaug			
to dig		koŋk’gu	xuŋkīme	xuŋki-			
to brush, to rub (ink)		xiŋkijgu ~ xiingkigu	īŋkıme				
black birch		tjabger			tebgurán		
smoke pipe		dajr		dairi	derí ~ dáire ~ dairí	darí ~ déira	dairá ~ dai ~ de
tobacco		dangga	dȧmgi	damga ~ damg(i)	damgá	dambagú	dangá ~ dánga ~ danɣá
to grab, snatch, seize	bōlga-	boleegu					
lit. robber-slave	sandū	čaandu					
bug	sɯ̄sɯ̄ ɯ̄	čeučun	soṷsū				
cap, cover		dajb	dai̭ib	daib	dáiɣu		dáiba
window		čonko ~ čoŋku	soŋkxo	soŋxo ~ soŋkŏ	čankó ~ čonkó	čonkú	čonɣó

The following table shows other borrowings from Mongolic languages into Solon and some of its dialects.

English	Solon	Dagur	Mongolic	Proto-Mongolic	Written Mongolian	Ongkor Solon	Turkestan Solon
to grow rich	bai̭ǯi- ~ bajaǯi-		*bajaǯi-				
to yawn	ebsī-	hebše(egu) ~ xäbšäägu		*ebsie- ~ *hebsie-			
trout	xoldū				quludu		
will, intent, to wish, to love		duar ~ duarele-			dura ~ durla-	dorlame	dorol’a- ~ durul’a-
gluttonous, greedy, hungry				*komu-kai		xomxŏ	

=== Manchu ===
Solon borrows some numerals and months are borrowed from Manchu along with other words. The following table provided Toshiro Tsumagari and Jerry Norman lists some words in Solon, English, Manchu and Proto-Tungusic.

English	Solon	Manchu	Proto-Tungusic
January	anεε bεε-	aniya biya	
November	unsun bεε-	omʃon biya	
December	jurgun bεε-	jorgon biya	
teacher	sew	sefu	
matter, business	baita	baita	
time(s)	mudan	mudan	
to know	sā-	sa-	sā-
to weep	soŋo	songgo	soŋgo-
	suxu	suhe	su̇kə
path between fields	uji	ujan	xūja(n)
on the other side	bargīdādu	bajila	*bargīlā
straight	təj ~ təji	siji-hūn	təjə̄
five	tuŋa ~ toŋa	sunja	tunga

=== Chinese ===
Solon uses many Chinese loanwords, which include soŋko (window), xooco (train), dεεnsi (television), gaŋbii (pen) and liibεε (week). Solon loanwords from Chinese also include adverbs (maaſan - promptly), interjections (wei - hi, hello) and grammatical particles (si - a subject/topic marker, baa - a sentence-final marker). Chinese words in Solon use verb-formative suffixes to create verbs, such as gaŋbii-da (to use a pen,to write with a pen).

Solon's lexical influence from Chinese has also been used for compounds and phrases. The following table from Toshiro Tsumagari includes words from Solon and Chinese with their literal transations into English.

Chinese	Solon
tielu (iron road)	sel teggü (railway)
zhongguo (central country)	doligu gürün (China)
chouyan (to pull tobacco)	daŋga taan- (to smoke)
da dianhua (to hit telephone)	dεεŋxo munda- (to make a telephone call)

=== Russian ===
The following are Solon words of Russian origin with their English translation from Toshiro Tsumagari.

Solon	English
kinoo	movie
xarandaa	pencil
xileeb	bread
doottor	doctor
mεεter	meter

== Glossary ==
The following list of Solon words comes from Shinjiro Kazama also in English.

English	Solon
head	dıl
hair	nuuttə, iŋatta
eye	iisal
nose	ňeenči
ear	seen
mouth	amma
tooth, teeth	iittə
hand	naala
finger	unaxan
foot, leg	bəldiir
skin	nanda
blood	səəči
bone	gıranda
flesh	uldə
body	bəjə
diseases, illness, sickness	ənux
medicine	əəŋ
salt	doosun
oil	immičči
liquor, wine	arixi
tobacco	daŋga
food	ǰittərə jəm
egg	umutta
bird	dəgii
knife	usxən
thread	širtə
clothes, clothing	təggačči
paper	saasun
thing	jəm
worm, insect	xulixan
fish	osxon
dog	nınaxın
house, home	ǰuu
money	məgun
tree	moo
grass	orotto
leaf	načči
flower, blossom	iggaa
seed	ur
field, acres, rice-field	taragan
way, road	təggu
river	doo
mountain	ur
water	muu
stone	ǰolo
earth	sirtan
fire	tog
wind	ədin
cloud	təčči
rain	tugdə
sky	bokkon
sun	sigun
moon	beega
star	oositta
day, afternoon	inigə
month	beega
year	anee
morning	əddə
night	dobbo
yesterday	tiinugu
tomorrow	timaasin
today	əri inigə
now	əsi
when	ooxidu
hour, time	ərin
how much	ooxii
how many	adii
altogether, all, whole	xokko
age	nasun
husband	ədəxən
wife	asi
father, papa	abaa, ami
mother, mama	əňəə, əməə
son	ukkəəxən
daughter	unaaǰi
elder brother	axaa, axin
elder sister	ədaa, əxin
younger brother	əkkəəxən nəxun
younger sister	unaaǰi nəxun
friend, mate	axaa nəxun
male	nirug bəj
female	axii bəj
person, man, one	bəj
I	bii
you	sii
he	tari
who	awu
name	gəbbi
letter	bitəg
voice	diggan
god	bokkon
this one	əri
it, that one	tari
which one	ijə
what	uxuŋ
why	ittu
here	ədu
there, that place, over there	tadu talaa
where, anywhere	iləə
left	jəəŋguu
right	bəruuŋguu
front	ǰuldəədə
back	amidaata
inside, inward, interior	doolo
out, outside, exterior	tuldəə
up	oroondo
down	əggilə

== Bibliography ==
- Baek, Sangyub (31 August 2023). Vovin, Alexander; Alonso de la Fuente, José Andrés; Janhunen, Juha (eds.). "Solon". The Tungusic Languages. Routledge: 206–233. doi:10.4324/9781315728391-9. ISBN 9781317542797.
- Blažek, Václav; Schwarz, Michal; Srba, Ondřej (2019). Altaic Languages: History of research, survey, classification and a sketch of comparative grammar (PDF). Brno: Masaryk University Press. doi:10.5817/CZ.MUNI.M210-9322-2019. ISBN 9788021093225.
- Janhunen, Juha (1996), Manchuria: an ethnic history, Volume 222 of Suomalais-ugrilaisen Seuran toimituksia, Suomalais-ugrilainen Seura, Finno-Ugrian Society, ISBN 9789519403847
- Janhunen, Juha (1996b), "Mongolic languages as idioms of intercultural communication in Northern Manchuria", in Wurm, Stephen Adolphe; Mühlhäusler, Peter; Tryon, Darrell T. (eds.), Atlas of languages of intercultural communication in the Pacific, Asia and the Americas, Walter de Gruyter, pp. 827–835, ISBN 978-3-11-013417-9
- Kazama, Shinjiro (2003). Basic vocabulary (A) of Tungusic languages (in Japanese). Osaka Gakuin University. pp. 12–80. ISSN 1346-082X.
- Khabtagaeva, Bayarma (2012). "The Dagur elements in Solon Evenki". Acta Orientalia Academiae Scientiarum Hungaricae. 65: 335–346. JSTOR 43282466.
- Moseley, Christopher; Nicolas, Alexandre (2010). Atlas of the world's languages in danger. UNESCO.
- Nargil (March 2025). "The Language Ecology and Endangerment of Solon, a Tungusic Language Spoken in China". Sibirica. 24 (1). ResearchGate. doi:10.3167/sib.2025.240101.
- Nargil (2026). A Grammar of Solon: A Northern Tungusic Language of Northeast China. Lumière University Lyon 2.
- Piispanen, Peter Sauli (2019). Languages in Contact: Solon and Dagur. Stockholm: Academia.edu.
- Tsumagari, Toshiro (2009). A sketch of Solon grammar. Journal of the Graduate School of Letters. Hokkaido University.
