= Uilta language =

Tungusic language of Russia

Uilta
- Orok
- Уилта кэсэни
- Native to: Russia, Japan
- Region: Sakhalin Oblast (Russian Far East), Hokkaido
- Ethnicity: 300 Orok (2010 census)
- Native speakers: 8–10 (2019–2025); 116 (2020 census)
- Language family: Tungusic: Southern; Nanaic; Uilta
- Writing system: Cyrillic

Language codes
- ISO 639-3: oaa
- Glottolog: orok1265
- ELP: Orok
- Linguasphere: 44-CAA-ef
- Uilta is classified as Critically Endangered by the UNESCO Atlas of the World's Languages in Danger.

Uilta (Orok: ульта, also called Ulta, Ujlta, (Note: Uilta may come from the word ulaa 'domestic reindeer'.) or Orok) is a Tungusic language spoken in the Poronaysky and Nogliksky Administrative Divisions of Sakhalin Oblast, in the Russian Federation, by the Uilta people. The northern Uilta who live along the river of Tym’ and around the village of Val have reindeer herding as one of their traditional occupations. The southern Uilta live along the Poronay near the city of Poronaysk. The language is split in two dialects with very few differences: northern Doronneni and southern Poronaysk.

== Classification ==
Uilta is closely related to Nanai, and is classified within the southern branch of the Tungusic languages. Classifications which recognize an intermediate group between the northern and southern branch of Manchu-Tungus classify Uilta (and Nanai) as Central Tungusic. Within Central Tungusic, Glottolog groups Uilta with Ulch as "Ulchaic", and Ulchaic with Nanai as "Central-Western Tungusic", while Oroch, Kilen and Udihe are grouped as "Central-Eastern Tungusic".

== Distribution ==
Although there has been an increase in the total population of the Uilta there has been a decrease in people who speak Uilta as their mother tongue. The total population of Uiltas was at 200 in the 1989 census of which 44.7, then increased to approximately 300–400 persons. However, the number of native speakers decreased to 25–16 persons. According to the results of the Russian population census of 2002, Uilta (all who identified themselves as "Oroch with Ulta language", "Orochon with Ulta language", "Uilta", "Ulta", "Ulch with Ulta language" were attributed to Uilta) count 346 people, 201 of whom are urban and 145 of whom are village dwellers. The percentage of 18.5%, which is 64 people pointed that they have a command of their ("Ulta") language, which, mostly, should be considered as a result of increased national consciousness in the post-Soviet period than a reflection of the real situation. In fact, the number of those people with a different degree of command of the Uilta language is less than 10 and the native language of the population is overwhelmingly Russian. Therefore because of the lack of a practical writing system and sufficient official support the Uilta language has become an endangered language.

The language is critically endangered or moribund. According to the 2002 Russian census there were 346 Uilta living in the north-eastern part of Sakhalin, of whom 64 were competent in Uilta. By the 2010 census, that number had dropped to 47. Uilta also live on the island of Hokkaido in Japan, but the number of speakers is uncertain, and certainly small. Yamada (2010) reports 10 active speakers, 16 conditionally bilingual speakers, and 24 passive speakers who can understand with the help of Russian. The article states that "It is highly probable that the number has since decreased further."

Uilta is divided into two dialects, listed as Poronaisk (southern) and Val-Nogliki or Doronneni (northern). The few Uilta speakers in Hokkaido speak the southern dialect. "The distribution of Uilta is closely connected with their half-nomadic lifestyle, which involves reindeer herding as a subsistence economy". The Southern Uilta people stay in the coastal Okhotsk area in spring and summer, and move to the North Sakhalin plains and East Sakhalin mountains during fall and winter. The Northern Uilta people live near the Terpenija Bay and the Poronai River during spring and summer and migrate to the East Sakhalin mountains for autumn and winter.

== Documentation ==
Matsuura Takeshirō and Ikegami Jirō were one of the first and most significant scholars in documenting Uilta. Matsuura wrote down about 350 Uilta words in Japanese, including about 200 words with grammatical remarks and short texts. Japanese researcher Nakanome Akira, during the Japanese possession of South Sakhalin, researched the Uilta language and published a small grammar with a glossary of 1000 words. Other researchers who published some work on the Uilta were Magata Hisaharu, Kawamura Hideya, T.I Petrova, A.I Novikova, L.I Sem, and contemporary specialist L.V. Ozolinga. Magata published a substantial volume of dictionaries titled "A Dictionary of the Uilta Language / Uirutago Jiten" in 1981. Others contributing to Uilta scholarship were Ozolinga, who published two substantial dictionaries: one in 2001 with 1200 words, and one in 2003 with 5000 Uilta-Russian entries and 400 Russian-Uilta entries.

== Phonology ==
=== Consonants ===
Uilta consonant phonemes
		Bilabial	Alveolar	Post- alveolar	Velar
Nasal		m	n (Note: /n/ becomes [ɲ] before /i/ or /ɛ/ neutralizing with /ɲ/.)	ɲ	ŋ
Plosive	voiceless	p	t	tʃ	k
Plosive	voiced	b	d	dʒ	ɡ (Note: Intervocalic /g/ is realized as the fricative [ɣ].)
Fricative			s (Note: /s/ is generally realized as [s] before /a/ or /ɔ/ and [sʲ~ʃ] otherwise.)		x
Tap			ɾ (Note: /ɾ/ and /l/ when followed by a voiceless consonant are often devoiced.)		
Approximant			l	j	w

=== Vowels ===
Uilta vowel phonemes
	Front	Central	Back
Close	i		u
Close-mid		ɵ ~ o	
Open-mid	ɛ (Note: /ɛ/ occurs most often in the diphthong /ɛu/ or as the long vowel /ɛɛ/. The short monophthong /ɛ/ rarely occurs on its own.)	ə	ɔ
Open		a	

Uilta has constrastive vowel length.

=== Phonotactics ===
==== Syllable structure ====
Uilta has a (C)V(V)(C) (Note: C represents a position to be filled with a consonant, V represents a position to be filled with a vowel and parentheses indicate that a position is optional. Long vowels fill two vowel positions, i.e. VV is either a diphthong or a long vowel and V is always a short monophthong.) syllable structure. Monosyllabic words always contain either a diphthong or a long vowel, thus no words have the structure *(C)V(C). All consonants may occur both syllable initial and syllable final, however /ɾ/ may not occur word initial, and /m/, /n/ and /l/ are the only consonants that can be word final, (Note: Consonants other than /m/, /n/ and /l/ may occur word finally in words of onomatopoeic origin.) with /m/ and /n/ only being permitted to be word final in monosyllabic words.

==== Morae ====
Syllables can be further divided into morae which determine stress and timing of the word. The primary mora of a syllable consists of the vowel and the initial consonant if there is one. After the primary mora an additional each vowel or consonant in the syllable form secondary morae. Any word typically contains a minimum of two morae.

==== Pitch accent ====
Uilta has non-phonemic pitch accent. Certain morae are accented with higher pitch. High pitch begins on the second mora (Note: Except when the accent peak falls on the first mora, in which case only the accent peak has high pitch.) and ends on the accent peak. The accent peak falls on the second to last mora if it is primary and the closest preceding primary mora otherwise.

For example pa.ta.la (transl. girl) is made of three syllables each consisting of one primary mora. Thus the accent peak falls on ta, the penultimate mora. In ŋaa.la (transl. hand), there are two syllables and three morae, the penultimate mora is a, a secondary mora, so the accent peak falls on the previous mora, ŋa.

==== Vowel harmony ====
A diagram illustrating the vowel groups in Uilta Close vowels Open vowels Neutral

Words in Uilta exhibit vowel harmony. Uilta vowels can be divided into three groups based on how they interact with vowel harmony:

- Close: /ə/ /o ~ ɵ/
- Neutral: /i/ /ɛ/ /u/
- Open: /a/ /ɔ/

Close and open vowels cannot coexist with each other in the same word. Neutral vowels have no restrictions and can occur in words with close vowels, open vowels or other neutral vowels.

== Orthography ==
⟨Н⟩ with left hook is used in Uilta to represent a palatal nasal, and is Romanized as Ɲ.

The language is taught in one school on the island of Sakhalin, and various literature is being created in the language, supporting propaganda aimed at spreading Uilta.

Uilta Cyrillic alphabet
А а	А̄ а̄	Б б	В в	Г г	Д д	Е е	Е̄ е̄
Ӡ ӡ	И и	Ӣ ӣ	Ј ј	К к	Л л	М м	Н н
Ԩ ԩ	Ӈ ӈ	О о	О̄ о̄	Ө ө	Ө̄ ө̄	П п	Р р
С с	Т т	У у	Ӯ ӯ	Х х	Ч ч	Э э	Э̄ э̄

In 2008, the first Uilta primer was published, which established a writing system.

== Morphology ==
The Uilta language is formed by elements called actor nouns. These actor nouns are formed when a present participle is combined with the noun – ɲɲee. For example, the element – ɲɲee (< *ɲia), has become a general suffix for 'humans', as in ǝǝktǝ-ɲɲee ‛woman’, geeda-ɲɲee ‛one person’ and xasu-ɲɲee ‛how many people?’.

Uilta has participial markers for three tenses: past -xa(n-), present +ri, and future -li. When the participle of an uncompleted action, +ri, is combined with the suffix -la, it creates the future tense marker +rila-. It also has the voluntative marker (‘let us…!’) +risu, in which the element -su diachronically represents the 2nd person plural ending. Further forms were developed that were based on +ri: the subjunctive in +rila-xa(n-) (fut-ptcp.pst-), the 1st person singular optative in +ri-tta, the 3rd person imperative in +ri-llo (+ri-lo), and the probabilitative in +ri-li- (ptcp.prs-fut).

In possessive forms, if the possessor is human, the suffix -ɲu is always added following the noun stem. The suffix -ɲu indicates that the referent is an indirect or an alienable possessee. To indicate direct and inalienable possession, the suffix -ɲu is omitted. For example,

- ulisep -ɲu- bi 'my meat' vs. ulise-bi 'my flesh'
- böyö -ɲu- bi 'my bear' vs. ɲinda-bi 'my dog'
- sura – ɲu – bi 'my flea' vs. cikte-bi 'my louse'
- kupe – ɲu – bi 'my thread' vs. kitaam-bi 'my needle'

Pronouns are divided into four groups: personal, reflexive, demonstrative, and interrogative. Uilta personal pronouns have three persons (first, second, and third) and two numbers (singular and plural).

	Singular	Plural
1st	bii	buu
2nd	sii	suu
3rd	nooni	nooci

== Syntax ==
Noun phrases have the following order: determiner, adjective, noun.

Tari goropci nari
DET ADJ N
That old man.

Eri goropci nari
DET ADJ N
‘This old man.’

Arisal goropci nari-l
DET ADJ N
‘Those old men’.

Subjects precede verbs:

Bii xalacci-wi
S V
‘I will wait’.

{ii bii} ŋennɛɛ-wi
S V
‘Yes, I will go’.

With an object the order is SOV:

Sii gumasikkas nu-la
S O V
‘You have money’.

Adjectives go after their noun:

tari {nari caa} ninda-ji kusalji tuksɛɛ-ni
DET S N ADJ V
‘That man runs faster than that dog’.

== See also ==
- Orok people
- Sakhalin
