= Oroqen =

Oroqen or Orochen or variants may refer to:

- Oroqen people, an Tungusic ethnic people in Far East living in Primorsky Krai (Russia) and Heilongjiang (China).
- Oroqen language, a Northern Tungusic language spoken in Russia and China.
- Oroqen Autonomous Banner, subdivision of Inner Mongolia, China.
