= Oroch people =

Orochs Alternative names: Nani
Нани
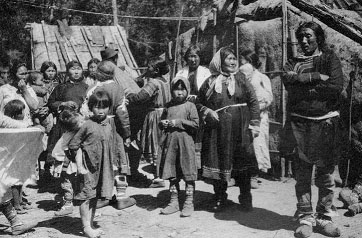
- Oroch people (circa 1920)

Total population
- c. 3308 (est.)

Regions with significant populations
- Russia: Khabarovsk Krai: 376; Magadan Oblast: 94; Sakhalin Oblast: 17; Primorsky Krai: 16: 527
- Ukraine: 288 (2001)

Languages
- Oroch language, Russian

Religion
- Shamanism, Russian Orthodoxy

Related ethnic groups
- Evens, Evenks, Ulchs, Nanai, Orok, Udege

Settlement of Orochs in the Far Eastern Federal District by urban and rural settlements in %, 2010 census

Orochs (Russian О́рочи), Orochons, or Orochis (self-designation: Nani) are a people of Russia that speak the Oroch (Orochon) language of the Southern group of Tungusic languages. According to the 2002 census there were 686 Orochs in Russia. According to the 2010 census there were 596 Orochs in Russia.

Orochs traditionally settled in the southern part of the Khabarovsk Krai, Russia and on the Amur and Kopp rivers. In the 19th century, some of them migrated to Sakhalin. In the early 1930s, the Orochi National District was created, but was cancelled shortly thereafter "due to lack of native population".

Because the people never had a written language, they were educated in Russian. Their language, Oroch, is on the verge of extinction; According to the 2021 census there are only about 43 native speakers of the language. They follow Shamanism and Russian Orthodox Church.

There are around 800 Orochs in Ukraine, which moved into Ukraine during the 1930s. Their religion is mostly ethnic religions, and they currently speak Oroch.

== History ==
Between 1963 and 1993, major changes took place in Oroch families:

- Almost all Orochi marriages became inter-ethnic - in 1951-1955, 73% of Orochi marriages were mono-ethnic, and in 1991-1995 only 9%.
- The share of Oroch-Russian marriages increased sharply from 9% in 1951-1955 to 82% in 1991-1995.
- The maximum size of an Oroch family decreased from 10 to 7 people from 1963 to 1993.
- The average family size of the Orochi in 1993 was 2.9 people, compared to 4.8 in 1963.

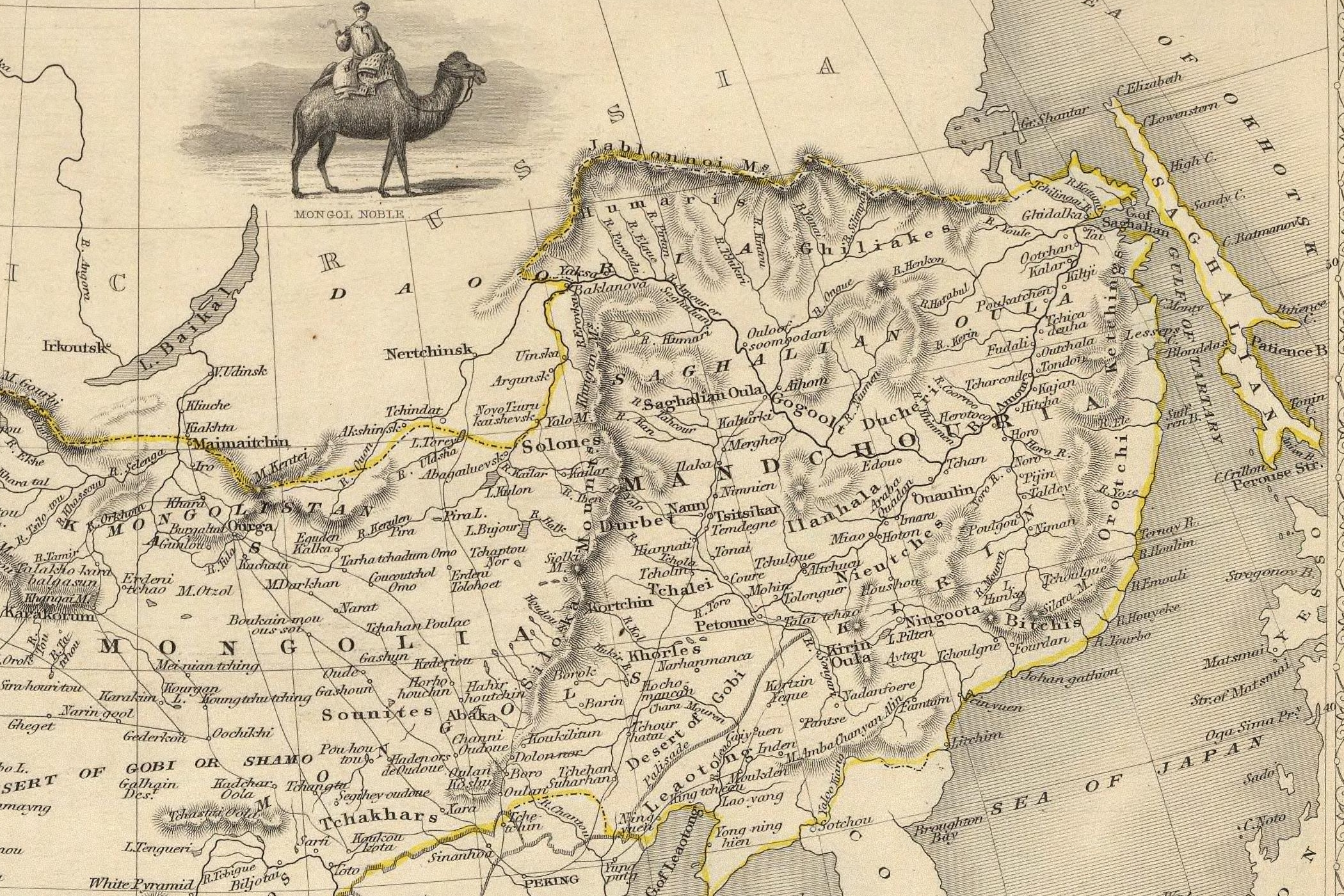
Orochis placed near the Sea of Japan on an 1851 map.
