= ORH =

ORH or orh may refer to:

- Oroqen language (ISO 639-3: orh), a Northern Tungusic language spoken in the People's Republic of China and Russia
- Worcester Regional Airport (IATA and FAA LID: ORH), an airport in Worcester County, Massachusetts, United States
