= Nanaic languages =

Tungusic language subgroup

Nanaic
- Central-Western Tungusic
- Geographic distribution: Manchuria, Sakhalin
- Linguistic classification: Tungusic: Southern; Nanaic
- Proto-language: Proto-Nanaic
- Subdivisions: Nanai; Ulch; Orok

Language codes
- Glottolog: orok1264

The Nanaic languages form a subgroup of Tungusic languages of Far East Russia and northeastern China.

== Languages ==
Languages and dialects (in italics) are:

- Nanaic
  - Nanai – diverse, may be separate languages
    - Hezhe (Heilongjiang)
    - Najkhin Nanai (Middle-Lower Amur)
    - Kur-Urmi Nanai (Khabarovsk)
    - Bikin Nanai (Ussuri)
  - Ulch
  - Uilta
