= Tungusic languages =

Language family of Siberia and Manchuria

Tungusic
- Geographic distribution: Siberia, Manchuria, Xinjiang
- Ethnicity: Tungusic peoples
- Linguistic classification: One of the world's primary language families
- Proto-language: Proto-Tungusic
- Subdivisions: Northern (Ewenic–Udegheic); Southern (Jurchenic–Nanaic)

Language codes
- ISO 639-5: tuw
- Glottolog: tung1282
- Geographic distribution of the Tungusic languages

The Tungusic languages (/tʊŋˈɡʊsɪk/; also known as Manchu–Tungus and Tungus) form a language family spoken in eastern Siberia and northern China by Tungusic peoples. There are approximately 75,000 native speakers of the dozen living languages of the Tungusic language family. Today, the most spoken language in the family is Xibe, a southern Tungusic language spoken by a group that migrated from Manchuria to Xinjiang in the 18th century. It is followed by the northern Tungusic languages Evenki, spoken in Northeast China and the Russian Far East, and Even, in northeastern Siberia. Many Tungusic languages are critically endangered, including Manchu, the most historically influential of this family and an official language of the Qing Empire. The term "Tungusic" is from an exonym for the Evenk people (Ewenki) used by the Yakuts ("tongus").

== Classification ==
Linguists working on Tungusic have proposed a number of different classifications based on different criteria, including morphological, lexical, and phonological characteristics. Some scholars have criticized the tree-based model of Tungusic classification and argue that the long history of contact among the Tungusic languages makes them better treated as a dialect continuum.

Current geographic distribution of languages in the Tungusic family.: Even Evenki Negidal Oroqen Kili / Oroch Udihe / Manchu Xibe Nanai Orok (Uilta) Ulch

The main classification is into a northern branch and a southern branch (Georg 2004) although the two branches have no clear division, and the classification of intermediate groups is debatable.

Four mid-level subgroups are recognized by Hölzl (2018), namely Ewenic, Udegheic, Nanaic, and Jurchenic.

Population distribution of total speakers of Tungusic languages, by speaker
1. Xibe (55.0%)
2. Evenki (29.0%)
3. Even (10.4%)
4. Others (5.58%)

Alexander Vovin notes that Manchu and Jurchen are aberrant languages within South Tungusic but nevertheless still belong in it, and that this aberrancy is perhaps due to influences from the Para-Mongolic Khitan language, from Old Korean, and perhaps also from Chukotko-Kamchatkan and unknown languages of uncertain linguistic affiliation.

The classification in Hölzl (2018) follows:

- Tungusic
  - Southern Tungusic (Jurchenic–Nanaic)
    - Jurchenic (Southwestern Tungusic) ("Manchu group")
      - Jurchen† (extinct, developed into Manchu in the 17th century)
        - Manchu: speakers originated from the Sungari Ula River area (they founded the Jin and Qing or Manchu dynasties of China)
        - Xibe: spoken in Qapqal Xibe Autonomous County, Xinjiang. (Developed separately since 1764 from a Qing military garrison)
      - Chinese Kyakala† (恰喀拉)
      - Bala†? (巴拉)
      - Alchuka† (阿勒楚喀)
    - Nanaic (Southeastern Tungusic) ("Nanai group" / "Amur group")
      - Nanai (Gold, Goldi, Hezhen) (Akani, Birar, Samagir)
        - Upper Amur
          - Right-bank Amur
          - Sungari
          - Bikin (Ussuri)
        - Central Amur
          - Sakachi-Alyan
          - Naykhin (basis of standard Nanai but not identical)
          - Dzhuen
        - Lower Amur
          - Bolon
          - Ekon
          - Gorin
      - Uilta
        - Northern (Northeast Sakhalin, Village Val of Nogliksky)
        - Southern (South Sakhalin, Poronaysky)
      - Ulch / Olcha
  - Northern Tungusic (Ewenic–Udegheic)
    - Ewenic
      - Even (Lamut) (in eastern Siberia)
        - Arman† (transitional between Even and Evenki)
        - Indigirka
        - Kamchatka
        - Kolyma-Omolon
        - Okhotsk
        - Ola
        - Tompon
        - Upper Kolyma
        - Sakkyryr
        - Lamunkhin
      - Evenki
        - Evenki (obsolete: Tungus), spoken by the Evenki in central Siberia and Manchuria
          - Solon (Solon Ewenki)
            - Hihue/Hoy (basis of the standard, but not identical)
            - Haila'er
            - Aoluguya (Olguya)
            - Chenba'erhu (Old Bargu)
            - Morigele (Mergel)
          - Siberian Ewenki / Ewenki of Siberia
            - Northern (spirant)
              - Ilimpeya (subdialects: Ilimpeya, Agata and Bol'shoi, Porog, Tura, Tutonchany, Dudinka/Khantai)
              - Yerbogachen (subdialects: Yerbogachen, Nakanno)
            - Southern (sibilant)
              - Hushing
                - Sym (subdialects: Tokma/Upper Nepa, Upper Lena/Kachug, Angara)
                - Northern Baikal (subdialects: Northern Baikal, Upper Lena)
              - Hissing
                - Stony Tunguska (subdialects: Vanavara, Kuyumba, Poligus, Surinda, Taimura/Chirinda, Uchami, Chemdal'sk)
                - Nepa (subdialects: Nepa, Kirensk)
                - Vitim-Nercha/Baunt-Talocha (subdialects: Baunt, Talocha, Tungukochan, Nercha)
            - Eastern (sibilant-spirant)
              - Vitim-Olyokma (subdialects: Barguzin, Vitim/Kalar, Olyokma, Tungir, Tokko)
              - Upper Aldan (subdialects: Aldan, Upper Amur, Amga, Dzheltulak, Timpton, Tommot, Khingan, Chul'man, Chul'man-Gilyui)
              - Uchur-Zeya (subdialects: Uchur, Zeya)
              - Selemdzha-Bureya-Urmi (subdialects: Selemdzha, Bureya, Urmi)
              - Ayan-Mai (subdialects: Ayan, Aim, Mai, Nel'kan, Totti)
              - Tugur-Chumikan (subdialects: Tugur, Chumikan)
              - Sakhalin (no subdialects)
        - Negidal
          - Lower Negidal †
          - Upper Negidal
        - Oroqen
          - Gankui (basis of standard Oroqen but not identical)
          - Selpechen
          - Kumarchen
          - Selpechen
          - Orochen
        - Kili (previously thought to be a dialect of Nanai)
    - Udegheic (Oroch–Udege; strongly influenced by Southern Tungusic)
      - Oroch †?
        - Tumninsky dialect †?
        - Khadinsky dialect †?
        - Hungarisky dialect †?
      - Udege / Udihe
        - Kur-Urmi
        - Northern (Udihe)
          - Xor
          - Anjuj
          - (Xungari)
        - Southern (Kekar a.k.a. Kyakala)
          - Samarga
          - Iman; Bikin

Glottolog v5.2.1 classifies the Tungusic languages as follows:

Glottolog v5.2.1 classification
- Tungusic
  - Central–Western Tungusic / Nanaic
    - Nanai
      - Lower Ussari
      - Nuclear Nanai
        - Central Nanai
          - Bolon Nanai
          - Dzhuen
          - Torgon
        - Garin
          - Bicin
          - Samar
      - Sakachi–Alyan
    - Ulchaic
      - Orok (Uilta)
        - Poronaisk
        - Val-Nogliki
      - Ulch
  - Manchu–Jurchen / Jurchenic
    - Jurchen
    - Manchu–Xibe
      - Manchu
        - Alechuxa / Alchuka
        - Bala (China)
        - Jing
        - Lalin
      - Xibe
        - Aigun
        - Ibuci
        - Ilan Boo
        - Sibe
  - Northeastern Tungusic / Ewenic–Udegheic
    - Central–Eastern Tungusic / Udegheic
      - Kilen
        - Kili of Amur
        - Sungari
        - Upper Ussuri
      - Oroch–Udihe
        - Oroch
          - Kjakela
          - Namunka
          - Orichen
          - Tez
        - Udihe / Udege
          - Anjuski
          - Bikin
          - Iman
          - Khor
          - Khungari
          - Samargin
          - Sikhota Alin
    - Northern Tungusic / Ewenic
      - Evenki
        - Manchurian Evenki
          - Aoluguya
          - Borzya Khamnigan Evenki
          - Solon
            - Amur basin Solon
            - Hulun Buir Solon
            - Morigele
            - Nonni basin Solon
            - Ongkor Solon
          - Urulyungui Khamnigan Evenki
        - Siberian Evenki
          - Eastern Evenki
            - Bareya-Amgun
            - Barguzin Evenki
            - Chul'man-Gilyui
            - Sakhalin Evenki
            - Uchur-Zeya
            - Vitim-Olyokma
          - Northern Evenki
            - Ilimpeya
            - Yerbogachon
          - Southern Evenki
            - Hissing Evenki
            - Hushing Evenki
      - Ewenic
        - Arman
        - Even
          - Eastern Even
            - Berjozovka
            - Kamchatka
            - Kolyma-Omolon
            - Okhotsk
            - Ola
            - Sakkyryr
            - Upper Kolyma
          - Middle Even
            - Allaikha
            - Moma Even
            - Tompon
          - Western Even
            - Indigirka
            - Lamunkhin
            - Tjugasjir
      - Negidalic
        - Kur–Urmi
        - Negidal
          - Nizovsk
          - Samagir
          - Verkhovsk
      - Oroqen
        - Central Oroqen
        - Northeastern Oroqen
        - Southeastern Oroqen
          - Birar
          - Shengli
        - Western Oroqen

== History ==
=== Proto-Tungusic ===
Approximate Urheimat for Proto-Tungusic

Some linguists estimate the divergence of the Tungusic languages from a common ancestor spoken somewhere in Eastern Manchuria around 500 BC to 500 AD. (Janhunen 2012, Pevnov 2012) Other theories favor a homeland closer to Lake Baikal. (Menges 1968, Khelimskii 1985) While the general form of the protolanguage is clear from the similarities in the daughter languages, there is no consensus on detailed reconstructions. As of 2012, scholars are still trying to establish a shared vocabulary to do such a reconstruction. The Lake Khanka region was found to present the most likely homeland, based on linguistic and ancient genetic data.

There are some proposed sound correspondences for Tungusic languages. For example, Norman (1977) supports a Proto-Tungusic *t > Manchu s when followed by *j in the same stem, with any exceptions arising from loanwords. Some linguists believe there are connections between the vowel harmony of Proto-Tungusic and some of the neighboring non-Tungusic languages. For example, there are proposals for an areal or genetic correspondence between the vowel harmonies of Proto-Korean, Proto-Mongolian, and Proto-Tungusic based on an original RTR harmony. This is one of several competing proposals, and on the other hand, some reconstruct Proto-Tungusic without RTR harmony.

Some sources describe the Donghu people of 7th century BC to 2nd century BC Manchuria as Proto-Tungusic. Other sources sharply criticize this as a random similarity in pronunciation with "Tungus" that has no real basis in fact.

The historical records of the Korean kingdoms of Baekje and Silla note battles with the Mohe (Chinese: 靺鞨; pinyin: Mòhé) in Manchuria during the 1st and 2nd centuries. Some scholars suggest these Mohe are closely connected to the later Jurchens, but this is controversial.

Alexander Vovin (2015) notes that Northern Tungusic languages have Eskimo–Aleut loanwords that are not found in Southern Tungusic, implying that Eskimo–Aleut was once much more widely spoken in eastern Siberia. Vovin (2015) estimates that the Eskimo–Aleut loanwords in Northern Tungusic had been borrowed no more than 2,000 years ago, which was when Tungusic was spreading northwards from its homeland in the middle reaches of the Amur River.

Wang and Robbeets (2020) place the Proto-Tungusic homeland in the Lake Khanka region.

Liu et al. (2020) revealed that Haplogroup C-F5484 and its subclades are the genetic markers of Tungusic-speaking peoples. C-F5484 emerged 3,300 years ago and began to diverge 1,900 years ago, indicating the approximate age of differentiation of Tungusic languages.

=== Jurchen-Manchu language ===
The earliest written attestation of the language family is in the Jurchen language, which was spoken by the rulers of the Jin dynasty (1115–1234). The Jurchens invented a Jurchen script to write their language based on the Khitan scripts. During this time, several stelae were put up in Manchuria and Korea. One of these, among the most important extant texts in Jurchen, is the inscription on the back of "the Jin Victory Memorial Stele" (Da Jin deshengtuo songbei), which was erected in 1185, during the Dading period (1161–1189). It is apparently an abbreviated translation of the Chinese text on the front of the stele. The last known example of the Jurchen script was written in 1526.

The Tungusic languages appear in the historical record again after the unification of the Jurchen tribes under Nurhaci, who ruled 1616–1626. He commissioned a new Manchu alphabet based on the Mongolian alphabet, and his successors went on to found the Qing dynasty. In 1636, Emperor Hong Taiji decreed that the ethnonym "Manchu" would replace "Jurchen". Modern scholarship usually treats Jurchen and Manchu as different stages of the same language.

Currently, Manchu proper is a dying language. As of 2007, it was spoken natively by 18 residents of the village of Sanjiazi. It is spoken by a small number of learners as a second language, most of whom learn from universities, public schools, or individual instruction by other speakers. The closely related Xibe language spoken in Xinjiang, which historically was treated as a divergent dialect of Jurchen-Manchu, maintains the literary tradition of the script and has around 30,000 speakers. As the only language in the Tungusic family with a long written tradition, Jurchen-Manchu is a very important language for the reconstruction of Proto-Tungusic.

=== Other Tungusic languages ===
Other Tungusic languages have relatively short or no written traditions. Since around the 20th century, some of these other languages can be written in a Russian-based Cyrillic script or, in China, Pinyin-based or Mongolian-based scripts, but the languages remain primarily spoken languages.

== Lexical comparison ==
Numerals in various Tungus languages:

GLOSA	Northern Tungus				Southeast Tungus				Southwest Tungus			PROTO- TUNGUS
GLOSA	Even	Evenki	Negidal	Oroqen	Udihe	Orochi	Orok (Uilta)	Ulcha	Hezhen	Manchu	Xibe	PROTO- TUNGUS
'1'	ɵmen	əmun	ɵmɵn	umun	omo	omoː	geːda	umu	əmkən	əmkən	əmkən	*əmu-
'2'	dʒɵ:r	dʒuːr	dʒuːl	dʒuːr	dʒuː	dʒuː	duː	dʒuəl	dʐuru	dʂo	dʐu	*dʐubə(r)
'3'	ɪlan	ɪlan	ilan	ilan	ila	ila	ila	ila	ilan	ilɑn	ilan	*ilan
'4'	digen	dijin	diɣin	dijin	diː	diː	dʒin	dui	dujin	duin	dujin	*dügin
'5'	tunŋan	tʊŋŋa	toɲŋa	tʊŋŋa	tuŋa	tuŋa	tunda	tuɲdʒa	sundʑa	sundʑɑ	sundʐa	*tuɲga
'6'	ɲuŋen	niŋun	ɲuŋun	ɲuŋun	ɲuŋu	ɲuŋu	nuŋu	ɲuŋgu	niŋun	nyŋŋun	niŋun	*ɲuŋun
'7'	nadan	nadan	nadan	nadan	nada	nada	nada	nada	nadan	nɑdən	nadən	*nadan
'8'	dʒapkan	dʒaxʊn	dʒapkun	dʒapkʊn	dʒapu	dʒakpu	dʒappu	dʒakpu	dʐaqun	dʐoqoŋ	dʐaqun	*dʐakpun *dʐapkun
'9'	ujun	jəjin	ijəɣin	jəjin	jəji	xuju	xuju	xuji	ujyn	ujyn	ujin	*xegün
'10'	mɪan	dʒaːn	dʒaːn	dʒaːn	dʒaː	dʒaː	dʒoːn	dʒua	dʐuan	dʐuɑn	dʐuan	*dʐuban

== Research ==
The earliest Western accounts of Tungusic languages came from the Dutch traveler Nicolaes Witsen, who published in the Dutch language a book, Noord en Oost Tartarye (literally 'North and East Tartary'). It described a variety of peoples in the Russian Far East and included some brief word lists for many languages. After his travel to Russia, his collected findings were published in three editions, 1692, 1705, and 1785. The book includes some words and sentences from the Evenki language, then called "Tungus".

The German linguist Wilhelm Grube (1855–1908) published an early dictionary of the Nanai language (Gold language) in 1900, as well as deciphering the Jurchen language for modern audiences using a Chinese source.

== Common characteristics ==
The Tungusic languages are of an agglutinative morphological type, and some of them have complex case systems and elaborate patterns of tense and aspect marking. However, none of the languages have grammatical gender or noun classes. All Tungusic languages have postpositions. Counting is done in base ten, and the names of the cardinal numbers from 1 to 10 are cognates in most cases.

The normal word order for all of the languages is subject–object–verb.

=== Phonology ===
Tungusic languages exhibit a complex pattern of vowel harmony, based on two parameters: vowel roundedness and vowel tenseness (in Evenki, the contrast is back and front). Tense and lax vowels do not occur in the same word; all vowels in a word, including suffixes, are either one or the other. Rounded vowels in the root of a word cause all the following vowels in the word to become rounded, but not those before the rounded vowel. Those rules are not absolute, and there are many individual exceptions.

Vowel length is phonemic in most languages, with many words distinguished based on the distinction between short vowel and long vowel. Languages without long vowels consist of the Jurchenic languages (Jurchen, Manchu, Xibe) and the Hezhe language. Diphthongs also occur in all languages.

Tungusic words have simple word codas, and usually have simple word onsets, with consonant clusters forbidden at the end of words and rare at the beginning.

Below are Proto-Tungusic consonants as reconstructed by Tsintsius (1949) and the vowels according to Benzing (1955):

Consonants
		Labial	Dental	Palatal	Velar
Stop	voiceless	p	t		k
Stop	voiced	b	d		ɡ
Affricate	voiceless			t͡ʃ ⟨č⟩	
Affricate	voiced			d͡ʒ ⟨ǯ⟩	
Fricative			s	ʃ ⟨š⟩	x
Nasal		m	n	ɲ ⟨ń⟩	ŋ
Lateral approximant			l		
Rhotic			r		
Glide		w		j	

Vowels
	front	central	back
high	i y ⟨ü⟩	ɨ ⟨ï⟩	u
mid	e ø ⟨ö⟩		o
low		a	

== Relationships with other languages ==
Tungusic is today considered a primary language family. Especially in the past, some linguists linked Tungusic with Turkic and Mongolic languages, among others, in either the Altaic or the Transeurasian language family. However, the proposal that there are genetic rather than merely areal links remains highly controversial.

Some scholars believe that the language spoken in Europe by the Avars (who created the Avar Khaganate) is of Tungusic origin.

== See also ==
- Lists of endangered languages
- Language death
