= Ewenic languages =

Tungusic language subgroup

Ewenic
- Northern Tungusic
- Geographic distribution: Russia, China
- Linguistic classification: Tungusic: Northern; Ewenic
- Subdivisions: Even; Evenki group

Language codes
- Glottolog: nort3147

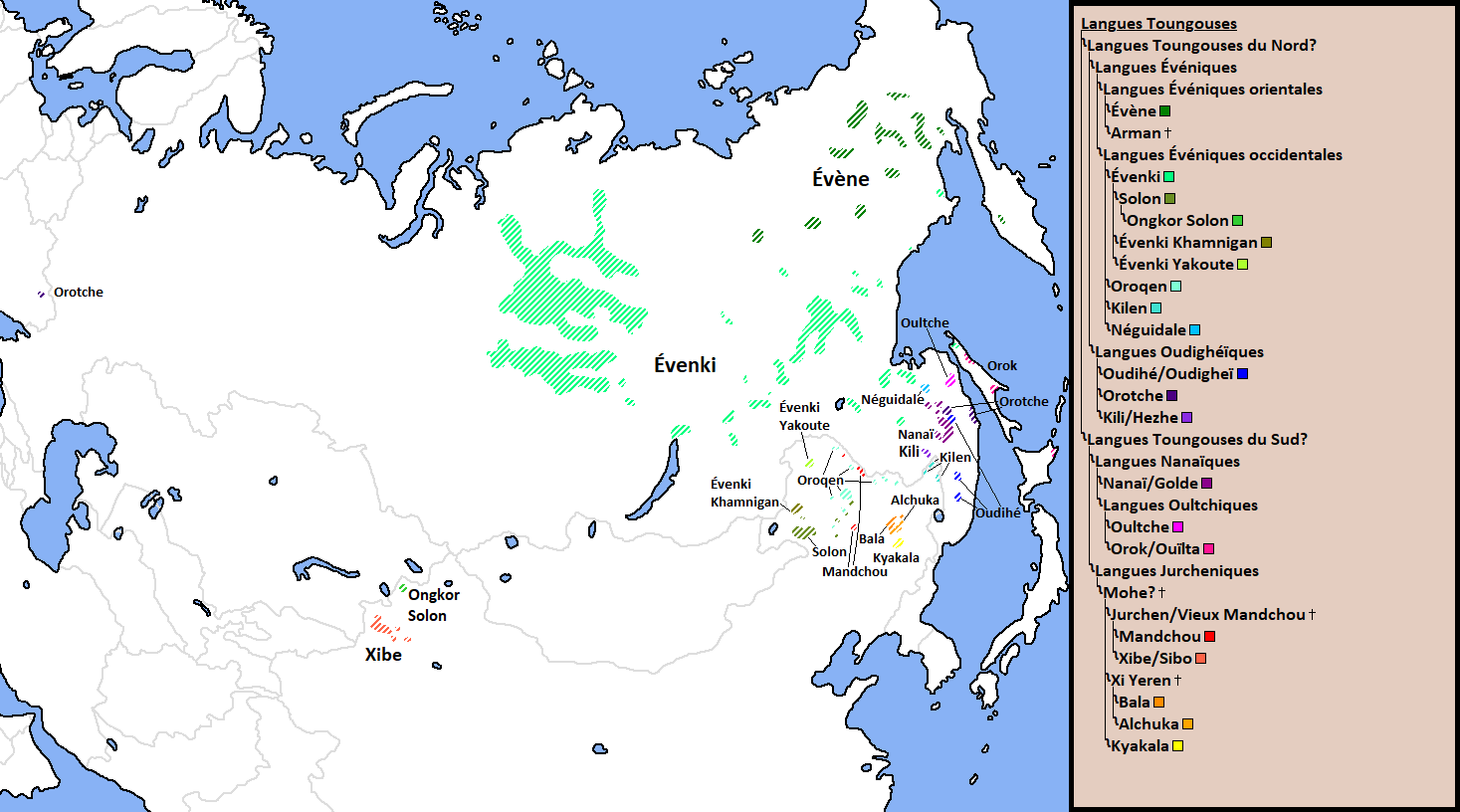
Tungusic languages- geographical distribution

The Ewenic languages, also known as the Northern Tungusic languages, (Note: This term is also used for a wider group including the Udegheic languages.) form a subgroup of Tungusic languages of Far East Russia and northeastern China.

== Languages ==
The Ewenic languages include:

- Ewenic
  - Even
  - Evenki group
    - Evenki
    - Negidal
    - Oroqen
    - Kili
