= Kili language =

Tungusic language of northeastern Manchuria and Russia

Kili
- Kur-Urmi
- Native to: Russia, China
- Native speakers: ~100 (2010)
- Language family: Tungusic: Northern; Ewenic; Evenki group; Kili

Language codes
- ISO 639-3: None (mis)
- Glottolog: kuro1242 Kur-Urmi kile1243 Kilen
- ELP: Kili; Kilen
- Linguasphere: 44-CAA-baw
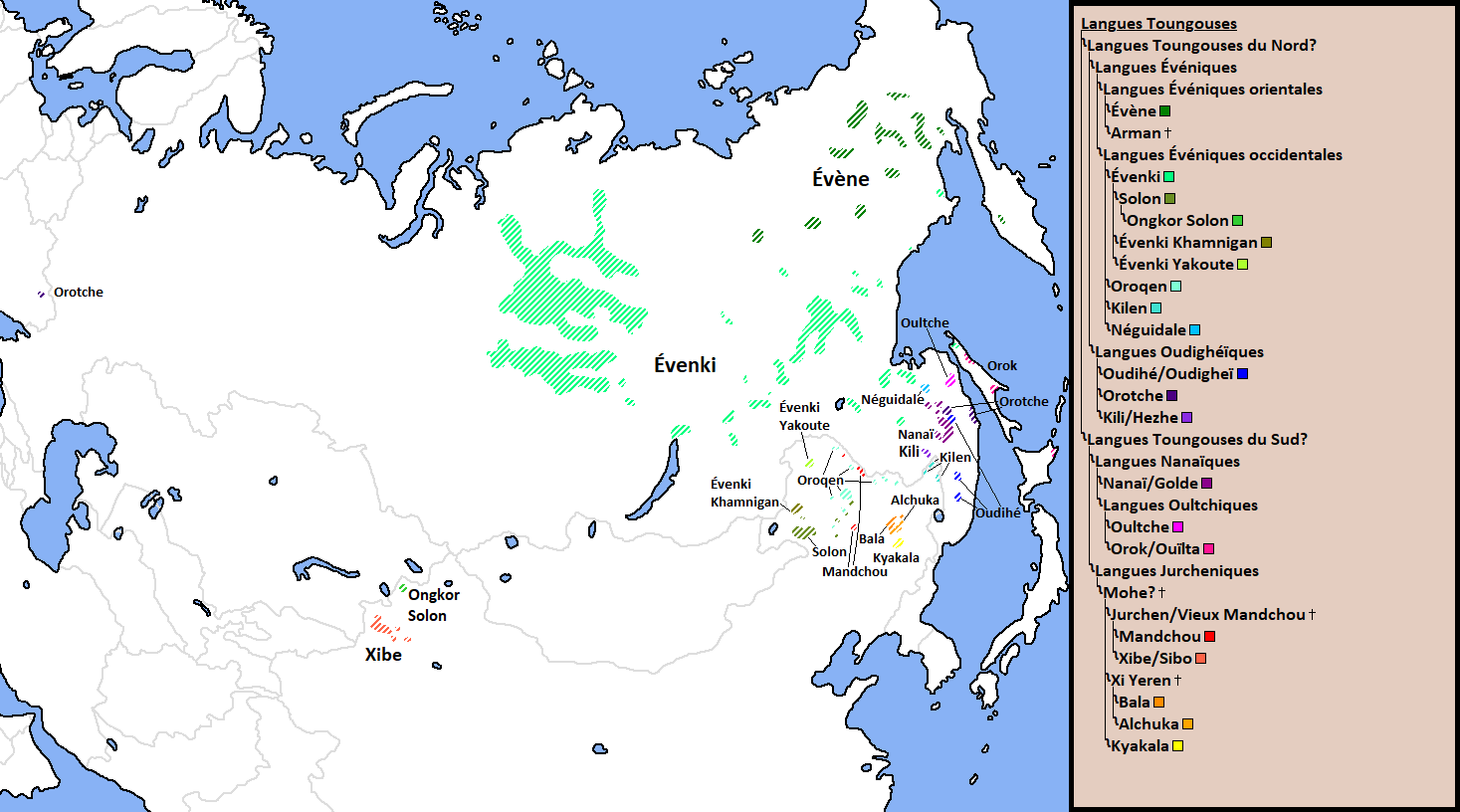
- Map of the Tungusic languages. Kili Kilen

- Kili is classified as Severely Endangered by the UNESCO Atlas of the World's Languages in Danger.

Kili (Kilen, Kirin, Kila), known as Hezhe or more specifically Qile'en (Chinese: 奇勒恩; pinyin: Qílè'ēn) in Chinese and also as the Kur-Urmi dialect of Nanai, is a moribund Tungusic language of Russia and China. Nanai is a Southern Tungusic language, and Kili has traditionally been considered one of the diverse dialects of Nanai, but it "likely belongs to the northern group".

== Alphabet ==
Sunik (1958) uses the following notations for Kili.

Cyrillic script	Romanization
и	i
ӣ	i:
і	ị
е	e
е̄	e:
y	u
ӯ	u:
ẏ	ụ
о	o
о̄	o:
э	ə
э̄	ə:
а	a
а̄	a:
б	b
п	p
д	d
ть	t
ть	t^{j}
дь	d^{j}
к	k
г	g
қ	q
ф	f
в	v
с	s
з	z
ј	j
х	h
ӷ	ɣ
ҳ	χ
ч	č
ӡ	dʒ
м	m
н	n
нь	ń
ң	ŋ
л	l
р	r
