= Udegheic languages =

Tungusic language subgroup

Udegheic
- Orochic, Central–Eastern Tungusic
- Geographic distribution: Russia
- Linguistic classification: Tungusic: Northern; Udegheic
- Subdivisions: Oroch; Udege

Language codes
- Glottolog: cent2235

The Udegheic languages (alternatively known as the Orochic languages) form a small subgroup of Tungusic languages of Far East Russia.

== Languages ==
Languages and dialects (in italics) are:

- Udegheic
  - Oroch
    - Koppi
    - Oroch Xadi
    - Tumnin
  - Udege (Udihe)
    - Kur-Urmi
    - Northern (Udihe)
      - Xor
      - Anjuj
      - (Xungari)
    - Southern (Kekar a.k.a. Kyakala)
      - Samarga
      - Iman; Bikin
