= Nanai language =

Tungusic language of eastern Russia

Nanai
- Hezhe, Gold
- На̄най хэсэни, на̄ни
- Native to: Russia, China
- Region: Russian Far East, Heilongjiang
- Ethnicity: Nanai people
- Native speakers: 1,400 (2010)
- Language family: Tungusic: Southern; Nanaic; Nanai
- Dialects: Nanai; Akani; Birar; Samagir
- Writing system: Cyrillic

Language codes
- ISO 639-3: gld
- Glottolog: nana1257
- ELP: Nanai
- Linguasphere: 44-CAA-ea
- Nanai is classified as Severely Endangered by the UNESCO Atlas of the World's Languages in Danger.

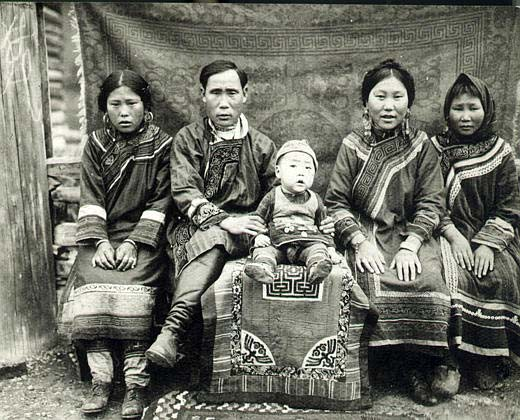
Hezhe (Nanai) family

The Nanai language (also called Gold, Goldi, or Hezhen) is spoken by the Nanai people in Siberia, and to a much smaller extent in China's Heilongjiang province, where it is known as Hezhe. The language has about 1,400 speakers out of 17,000 ethnic Nanai, but most (especially the younger generations) are also fluent in Russian or Chinese, and mostly use one of those languages for communication.

== Nomenclature ==
In China, the language is referred to as Hèzhéyǔ (Chinese: 赫哲语). The Nanai people there variously refer to themselves as /na nio/, /na bəi/, /na nai/ (which all mean "local people"), /ki lən/, and /χə ɖʐən/, the last being the source of the Chinese ethnonym Hezhe.

== Geographic distribution ==
The language is distributed across several distantly-located areas:

- Middle/lower Amur dialects (Naykhin, Dzhuen, Bolon, Ekon, etc.): the areas along the Amur River below Khabarovsk (Nanai, Amursk, Solnechny and Komsomolsk districts of Khabarovsk Krai);
- Kur-Urmi dialect: the area around the city of Khabarovsk (the Kur and Urmi rivers, and the Khabarovsk District of Khabarovsk Krai); probably not Nanai or even Southern Tungusic (see Kili language);
- Bikin dialect: Pozharsky District of Primorsky Krai (near the middle Ussuri River);
- Sungari dialect: boundary areas of the Ussuri River in China.

It is thought that in Russia, the Nanai language has been best preserved in the Nanai District of Khabarovsk Krai, because of the active Nanai-speaking community there, which has been active in working on the publication of books in Nanai, as well as textbooks on the language, and also because of the ethnic autonomous status of the Nanai District. According to Stolyarov's data, the worldwide Nanai population is 11,883, of whom 8,940 live in rural localities of Khabarovsk Krai. However, only 100–150 native speakers of the language remain there. The 2002 Census recorded 12,194 Nanai people who claimed to speak Russian as well. Three ethnic Nanai villages remain, those being Dzhuen, Ulika, and Dada; in the remaining populated areas, the proportion of Nanais among local residents is much smaller.

Scholars in China have traditionally presented less fine-grained dialect classifications; An identified only two, Hezhen and Qile'en, the former referring to all varieties of the language spoken in Russia. He conducted his studies in Jiejinkou, Bacha, and Sipai villages in Heilongjiang; at the time of his survey in 1982, the youngest fluent speaker was 55, and the oldest 72.

=== Historical dialect classifications ===
There are several classifications of Nanai dialects. Early classifications tended to be areal and paid less attention to criteria for the differentiation of dialects. Lipskoy-Val'rond's classification, which distinguishes seven dialects, is one example of this; he distinguished the Sungari, Upper Amur, Ussuri, Urmi, Kur, Central Amur, and Lower Amur dialects. In the 1920s, the period of initial studies of the Nanai language, the area of settlement of the Nanai people was more extensive than at present; many dialects, which had not yet been classified by researchers, later disappeared, and remain unnamed.

The next period of studies did not begin until after a 20-year interruption, at the end of the 1940s; by then, the number of dialects had grown, and subsequent classifications distinguished as many as ten. Also, the distribution of the Nanai language had sharply narrowed; many Lower Amur and Ussuri dialects remained unstudied. According to Sunik's classification, which emphasizes morphological and phonetic features, "Nanaian language forms two groups, which are decomposed into a number of dialects".

1. Upper Amur: Sakachi-Alyan, Naykhin, Bolon, Dzhuen, Garin
2. Central Amur: Kur-Urmi, Bikin, Right-bank Amur, Sungari, Ussuri

Avrorin divided the language into three varieties: Sungari (aka Upper Amur), (Lower) Amur, and Kur-Urmi, further subdividing them into a number of dialects. The basic difference with Sunik's classification concerns the Amur and Upper Amur groups: Avrovin considered Bolon and Dzhuen under Naykhin, while separating Kur-Urmi as its own group, while Sunik viewed Kur-Urmi as a dialect. Sem, in contrast, classified Nanai into Upper, Central, and Lower Amur groups, each divided into a number of dialects; he counted a total of ten dialects.

1. Upper Amur: Right-bank Amur, Sungari, Bikin (Ussuri), Kur-Urmi
2. Central Amur: Sakachi-Alyan, Naykhin, Dzhuen
3. Lower Amur: Bolon, Ekon, Gorin

Among the contemporary carriers of Nanaian language (middle and lower Amur dialects), dialect levelling and mixing has occurred due to extensive population migrations and the system of teaching of Nanai language (based on the Naykhin dialect); therefore it is difficult to differentiate the dialects in contemporary language data.

== Pedagogy ==
The Nanai language is taught in secondary schools in Russia, mainly in Nanai villages in Khabarovsk Krai.

In China, the Nanai (Hezhe) people use Chinese for writing. The number of speakers has been in continual decline for decades; by the 1980s, the use of the language was restricted to special situations and communication with family members. In an effort to reverse this decline, a text book for Hezhe schoolchildren discussing the Hezhe language was published in 2005 (in pinyin transcription).

== Phonology ==
=== Vowels and vowel harmony ===
The Nanai language has seven vowels in the Hezhen dialect /i, u, y, o, œ, a, ə/ and six in the Bikin dialect /i, ɪ, u, o, a, ə/. There are sixteen allowed diphthongs in total: /ai, aɪ, ao, əi, əo, ɪa, ɪo, ia, iə, io, iu, ua, ui, uo, oi, oɪ, ya, yə/; there are also two allowed triphthongs: /iao, uai/. Phonemic vowels change as follows based on surrounding consonants:

- [i] is elided after [dz, ts, s]
- /i/ becomes [ɪ] after /ɖʐ, ʈʂ, s/
- /i/ becomes [i̟] after /m, n, l, d/
- A glottal stop [ʔ] is inserted before /i/ when it begins a syllable and precedes /dz, s, tɕ, ɕ, l, m, ŋ/.
- /ɘ/ may optionally become [ɯ] in non-initial syllables
- A vowel in a final syllable is nasalised when it precedes /n/

The following table summarises the rules of vowel harmony.

Vowel harmony in Nanai
Class	Group	Members	Notes
Yang vowels	Group 1	[a]	
Yang vowels	Group 2	[o, œ]	Do not appear after [i, u, y]; also [o] does not appear after [œ]
Yin vowels	Group 3	[ə]	After [a, o], becomes neutral and can harmonise with any vowel
Neutral vowels	Group 4	[i]	
Neutral vowels	Group 5	[u, y]	[y] will not appear again after [y]

=== Consonants ===
As for consonants, there are twenty-nine:

	Labial		Dental / alveolar		Retroflex		(Alveolo-) Palatal		Velar		Uvular	
Stop	p	b	t	d					k	ɡ	q	ɢ
Affricate			ts	dz	ʈʂ	ɖʐ	tɕ	dʑ				
Fricative	ɸ		s	(z)	ʂ	ʐ	ɕ	(ʑ)	x	(ɣ)	χ	(ʁ)
Nasal		m		n				ɲ		ŋ		
Approximant				l				j		w		
Trill				r								

Phonemic consonants may optionally change as follows:

- /s ɕ χ/ become [z ʑ ʁ] (respectively) between two vowels
- /ɡ/ to [ɣ] in syllable-final position, before [d] in the following syllable

=== Dialects ===
Phonology of the various dialects of Nanai has been influenced by surrounding languages. Tolskaya specifically noted several phonological peculiarities of Bikin dialect which may indicate influence from Udege, including monophthongisation of diphthongs, denasalisation of nasal vowels, deletion of reduced final vowels, epenthetic vowel preventing consonant final words, and the deletion of intervocalic [w].

== Orthography ==
In the history of written Nanai, there are three stages:

- until the early 1930s, early attempts to create Cyrillic script writing;
- 1931–1937 – Latin script;
- since 1937 – modern Cyrillic script.

The first books in the Nanai language were printed by Russian Orthodox missionaries in the late 19th century in a Cyrillic orthography. In the 1920s–30s, after several false starts, the modern written form of the Nanai language was created by a team of Russian linguists led by Valentin Avrorin. The Nanai language uses the same alphabet as the Russian alphabet.

=== Nanai Latin script (1931–1937) ===
In 1930, it was decided to create a Unified Northern Alphabet on the Latin basis for the small-numbered peoples of the North. In January 1932, these alphabets, including Nanai, were officially approved at the I All-Russian Conference on the Development of Languages and Writings of the Peoples of the North. The approved Nanai alphabet was as follows:

A a	B в	Ꞓ є	D d	Ʒ ʒ	E e	Ə ə	F f
G g	H h	I i	J j	K k	L l	M m	N n
Ņ ņ	Ŋ ŋ	O o	P p	R r	S s	T t	U u
W w	Z z

In some versions of the alphabet, the letter Ꞓ ꞓ was replaced with the usual Latin C c and meant the same sound.

=== Nanai Cyrillic script (1937 – present) ===
On June 5, 1936, the Presidium of the Council of Nationalities of the CEC of the USSR decided to translate the written language of the peoples of the North, including the Nanai, into Cyrillic. At the beginning of 1937, the Nanai Cyrillic alphabet was officially approved – it included all the letters of the Russian alphabet except Щ щ and Ъ ъ. The sound [ŋ] was indicated by a combination of letters Нг нг. In 1939, the Nanai spelling rules in Cyrillic were adopted, refined in 1958, when the Nanai alphabet began to contain all 33 letters of the Russian alphabet, as well as the letter Ӈ ӈ (instead of Нг нг). However, in fact, in most publications, instead of Ӈ ӈ, the use of Нг нг continued.

The current version of the Nanai alphabet was approved in 1993. The modern Nanai alphabet has the following form:

А а	Б б	В в	Г г	Д д	Е е	Ё ё	Ж ж
З з	И и	Й й	К к	Л л	М м	Н н	Ӈ ӈ
О о	П п	Р р	С с	Т т	У у	Ф ф	Х х
Ц ц	Ч ч	Ш ш	Щ щ	Ъ ъ	Ы ы	Ь ь	Э э
Ю ю	Я я

To indicate long vowels in the educational literature, diacritics are used – macrons above the letters.

In China, where Nanai residents also live, in 1987 a reading book for Nanai schools was published with parallel text in Chinese and Nanai languages. Pinyin was used to write the Nanai text.

=== Alphabet matching table ===
Cyrillic	Latin	Cyrillic	Latin	Cyrillic	Latin	Cyrillic	Latin	Cyrillic	Latin
А а	A a	Ж ж	-	Н н	N n	У у	U u	Ъ ъ	-
Б б	В в	З з	Z z	Ӈ ӈ	Ŋ ŋ	Ф ф	F f	Ы ы	–
В в	W w	И и	I i	О о	O o	Х х	H h	Ь ь	–
Г г	G g	Й й	J j	П п	P p	Ц ц	–	Э э	Ə ə
Д д	D d, Ʒ ʒ	К к	K k	Р р	R r	Ч ч	Є є	Ю ю	–
Е е	–	Л л	L l	С с	S s	Ш ш	–	Я я	–
Ё ё	–	М м	M m	Т т	T t	Щ щ	–		

== Lexicon ==
Tolskaya's survey of the Nanai language also noted a variety of loanwords from Chinese, such as [ʐili] "calendar" from Chinese 日曆 (Pinyin: rìlì); a few also came from other languages, such as [pomidor] (tomato), almost certainly from Russian помидор, though the exact route of transmission is not attested, and it may have been reborrowed from other neighbouring languages rather than directly from Russian. There is also some vocabulary shared with Mongolian and the Turkic languages, such as:

- [sal] ("beard"; Mongolian [sahɘl], Uyghur and Kazakh [saqal]);
- [tœqo] ("chicken"; Mongolian [tahia], Uyghur [toχo], Kazakh [tawuq]);
- [χonin] ("sheep"; Mongolian [χœŋ], Uyghur and Kazakh [qoi]).

These too are likely loanwords, though proponents of the Altaic hypothesis may take these as evidence of a genetic relationship. Conversely, the Nanai language itself has also contributed some loanwords to the Udege language, supplanting Udege vocabulary:

- [banixe] (thank you), from Nanai [banixa], instead of Udege [usasa];
- [dœlbo] (work), from Nanai [dœbo], instead of Udege [etete];
- [daŋsa] (book) from Nanai [daŋsa], itself a loanword from Chinese 單子 (Pinyin: dānzi), which actually means "list".

A large degree of mutual assimilation of the two languages has been observed in the Bikin region; the Udege language itself only has 230 speakers left.

== Sample text ==
Sample text from a Bible translation published in 2002 is shown below.

Lord's Prayer (Luke 11:2–4)
Nanai (Cyrillic) with transliteration and English (NIV)

Нёани дахамдичии уӈкини: «Кэсивэ гэлэйдуэри туй ундусу: "Боаду, уйлэ би, Эндур Ама! Гэбукуди гэрбуси бигини. Си боа яловани далачайси эрин исигини! Наду-да, боаду-да Си чихалайси бигини!
Nǒani dahamdičii uŋkini: "Kesive geleĭdueri tuĭ undusu: 'Boadu, uĭle bi, Endur Ama! Gebukudi gerbusi bigini. Si boa ǎlovani dalačaĭsi erin isigini! Nadu-da, boadu-da Si čihalaĭsi bigini!
He said to them, "When you pray, say: 'Father, hallowed be your name, your kingdom come, your will be done, on earth as it is in heaven.

Ини таондоани сиагопова эпэмбэ бунду буру.
Ini taondoani siagopova epembe bundu buru.
Give us each day our daily bread.

Буэ оркимпова гудиэсигуру, буэ-дэ оркиӈку, наӈдаку гурумбэ гудиэсиэпу, буэ мурумпувэ-дэ эди памаванда, хай-да дялимбани, оркимбани эди дял дяпаванда"».
Bue orkimpova gudiesiguru, bue-de orkiŋku, naŋdaku gurumbe gudiesiepu, bue murumpuve-de edi pamavanda, haĭ-da dǎlimbani, orkimbani edi dǎl dǎpavanda.'"
Forgive us our sins, for we also forgive everyone who sins against us. And lead us not into temptation"

== Sources ==
- An, Jun (1986). 赫哲语简志 (An Outline of the Hezhe Language) (in Chinese). Nationalities Publishing House.
- He, Xuejuan; Wu Baozhu (January 2004). "街津口村赫哲语使用情况的调查 (Investigation on Hezhen language use in Jiejinkou Village)". 满语研究 (in Chinese). Archived from the original on 2007-09-27.
- Li, Fangchao (2005-06-06). "Textbook preserves Hezhe language". China Daily.
- Sem, L.I. (1976). Очерки диалектов нанайского языка: бикинский (уссурийский) диалект (in Russian).
- Stolyarov, A.V. (1994). Нанайский язык // Красная книга языков народов России: Энциклопедический словарь-справочник (in Russian).
- Nikolaeva, Irina; Maria Tolskaya (2001). A Grammar of Udihe. Walter de Gruyter.
- Информация по населенным пунктам, районам проживания и хозяйственной деятельности коренных малочисленных народов Севера и Дальнего Востока РФ (in Russian), Russia: Ministry of Economic Development and Trade, 2002-01-01
- Население по национальности и владению русским языком по субъектам Российской Федерации (Microsoft Excel) (in Russian). Федеральная служба государственной статистики.
- Zaksor, L. Zh. (2002). Теоретический курс [Theoretical course]. Нанайский язык [Nanai language] (in Russian). St. Petersburg: Просвещение. ISBN 5-09-005249-2.
