= Oroqen Autonomous Banner =

Oroqen Banner 鄂伦春旗 • ɔrɔtʃeenŋi buwaan • ᠣᠷᠴᠣᠨ ᠤ ᠬᠣᠰᠢᠭᠤ
- Autonomous banner
- Oroqen Autonomous Banner 鄂伦春自治旗 ɔrɔtʃeenŋi buwaan ᠣᠷᠴᠣᠨ ᠤ ᠥᠪᠡᠷᠲᠡᠭᠡᠨ ᠵᠠᠰᠠᠬᠤ ᠬᠣᠰᠢᠭᠤ
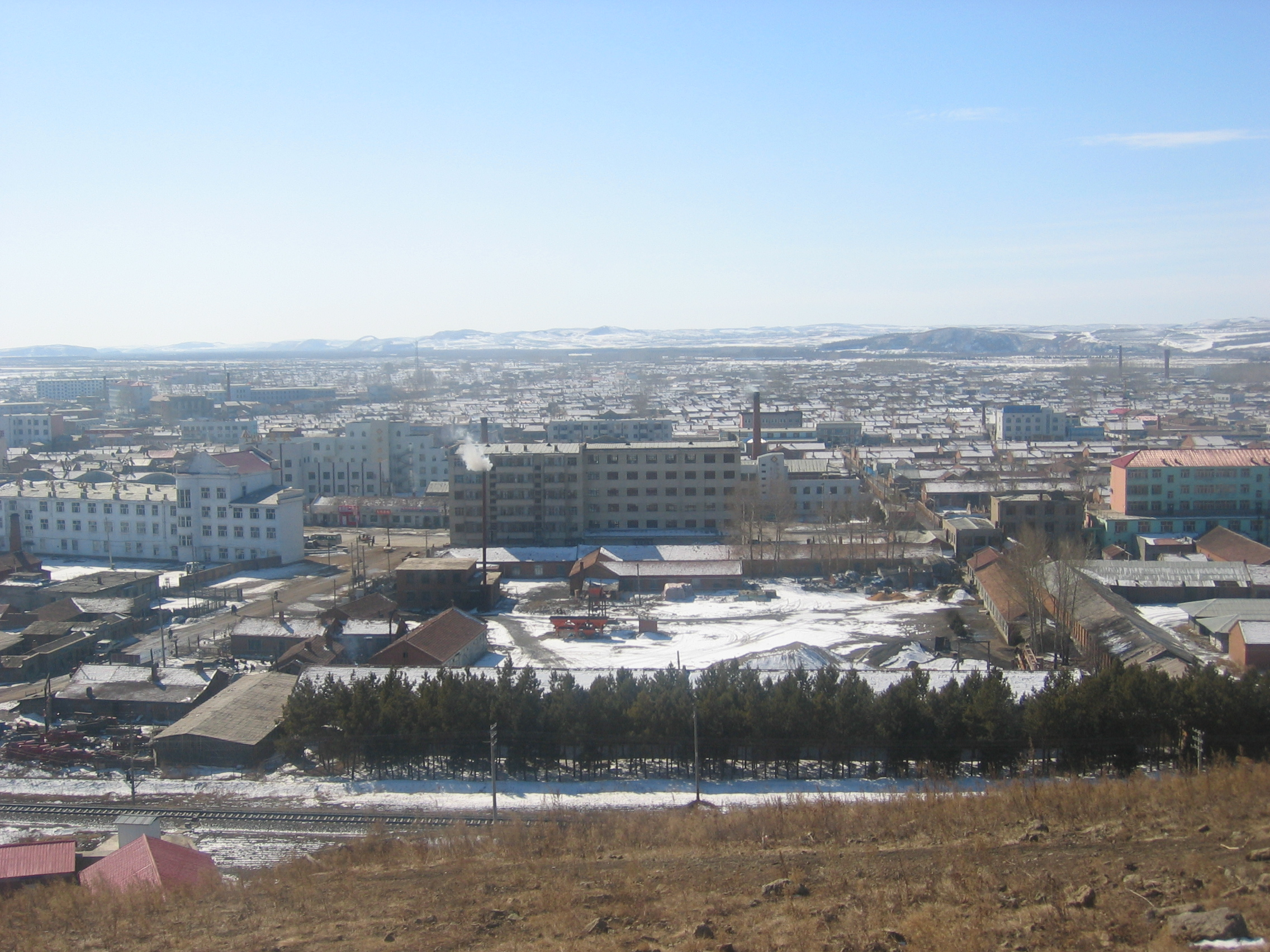

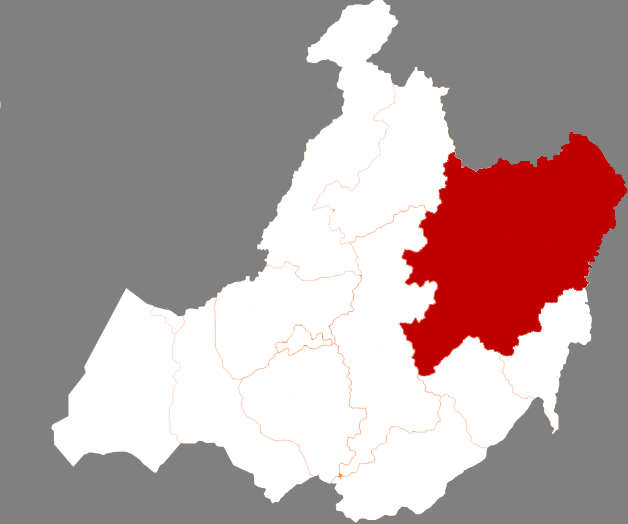
- Location in Hulunbuir

- Location in Inner Mongolia Oroqen (China)
- Coordinates: 50°35′N 123°43′E
- Country: China
- Autonomous region: Inner Mongolia
- Prefecture-level city: Hulunbuir
- Banner seat: Alihe (Ali Gol)

Area
  - Total: 60,378 km^{2} (23,312 sq mi)

Population (2020)
  - Total: 174,023
  - Density: 2.8822/km^{2} (7.4649/sq mi)
- Time zone: UTC+8 (China Standard)
- Website: www.elc.gov.cn

Oroqen Autonomous Banner

Chinese name
- Simplified Chinese: 鄂伦春自治旗
- Traditional Chinese: 鄂倫春自治旗
Transcriptions
Standard Mandarin
- Hanyu Pinyin: Èlúnchūn Zìzhìqí

Mongolian name
- Mongolian Cyrillic: Орчон өөртөө засах хошуу
- Mongolian script: ᠣᠷᠴᠣᠨ ᠤ ᠥᠪᠡᠷᠲᠡᠭᠡᠨ ᠵᠠᠰᠠᠬᠤ ᠬᠣᠰᠢᠭᠤ
Transcriptions
- SASM/GNC: Orčon-u öbertegen jasaqu qosiɣu

Oroqen name
- Oroqen: ɔrɔtʃeenŋi buwaan

Oroqen Autonomous Banner (Oroqen: ɔrɔtʃeenŋi buwaan; Mongolian: ᠣᠷᠴᠣᠨ ᠤ ᠥᠪᠡᠷᠲᠡᠭᠡᠨ ᠵᠠᠰᠠᠬᠤ ᠬᠣᠰᠢᠭᠤ; Chinese: 鄂伦春自治旗) is an autonomous banner that lies east of the urban district of Hailar in the prefecture-level city of Hulunbuir. It covers an area of 60,378 square kilometres (23,312 sq mi). As of the 2010 census, there were 223,752 inhabitants with a population density of 4.84 inhabitants per km^{2}.

== Administrative divisions ==
Oroqen Autonomous Banner is made up of 8 towns and 2 townships. The banner's seat of government is located in Alihe (Ali Gol).

Name	Simplified Chinese	Hanyu Pinyin	Mongolian (Hudum Script)	Mongolian (Cyrillic)	Oroqen	Administrative division code
Towns
Alihe Town (Ali Gol Town)	阿里河镇	Ālǐhé Zhèn	ᠠᠯᠢ ᠭᠣᠣᠯ ᠪᠠᠯᠭᠠᠰᠤ	Аль гол балгас	aali biraa kutuun	150723100
Dayangshu Town	大杨树镇	Dàyángshù Zhèn	ᠳ᠋ᠠ ᠶᠠᠩ ᠱᠦ ᠪᠠᠯᠭᠠᠰᠤ	Да ян шуу балгас	əgdiŋə ulixdaan kutuun	150723101
Ganhe Town	甘河镇	Gānhé Zhèn	ᠭᠠᠨ ᠾᠧ ᠪᠠᠯᠭᠠᠰᠤ	Ган ге балгас	gaan dɔɔn kutuun	150723102
Jiwen Town	吉文镇	Jíwén Zhèn	ᠵᠢᠸᠧᠨ ᠪᠠᠯᠭᠠᠰᠤ	Жвен балгас		150723103
Nomin Town	诺敏镇	Nuòmǐn Zhèn	ᠨᠣᠮᠢᠨ ᠪᠠᠯᠭᠠᠰᠤ	Номин балгас	nəmiin kutuun	150723104
Olobtai Town	乌鲁布铁镇	Wūlǔbùtiě Zhèn	ᠥᠯᠥᠪᠲᠠᠢ ᠪᠠᠯᠭᠠᠰᠤ	Өлөвтэй балгас		150723105
Yili Town	宜里镇	Yílǐ Zhèn	ᠢᠯᠢ ᠪᠠᠯᠭᠠᠰᠤ	Ил балгас		150723106
Keyihe Town	克一河镇	Kèyīhé Zhèn	ᠺᠧ ᠢ ᠾᠧ ᠪᠠᠯᠭᠠᠰᠤ	Ке И ге балгас		150723107
Townships
Guli Township	古里乡	Gǔlǐ Xiāng	ᠭᠦ᠋ ᠯᠢ ᠰᠢᠶᠠᠩ	Хөө ли шиян	guuli	150723200
Tuozhamin Township	托扎敏乡	Tuōzhāmǐn Xiāng	ᠲᠦᠸᠧ ᠵᠠ ᠮᠢᠨ ᠰᠢᠶᠠᠩ	Түве жаа мин шиян	totʃamiin	150723201

In addition, Oroqen Autonomous Banner claims jurisdiction over Jagdaqi and Songling District; technically however, the two districts are de facto under the jurisdiction of Daxing'anling Prefecture, Heilongjiang Province. The government of Hulunbuir disputes this arrangement.

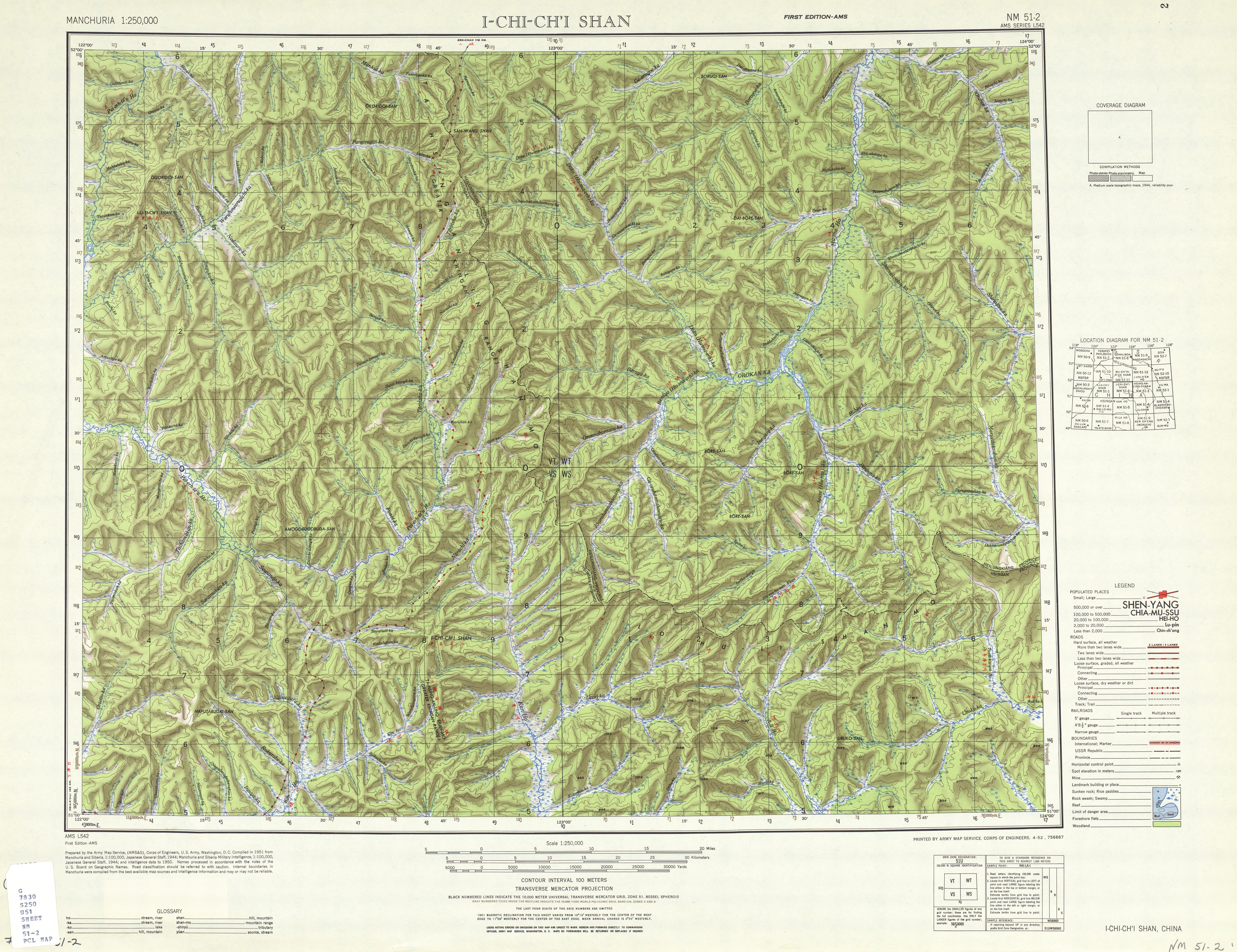
Map including part of Oroqen Autonomous Banner (AMS, 1951)

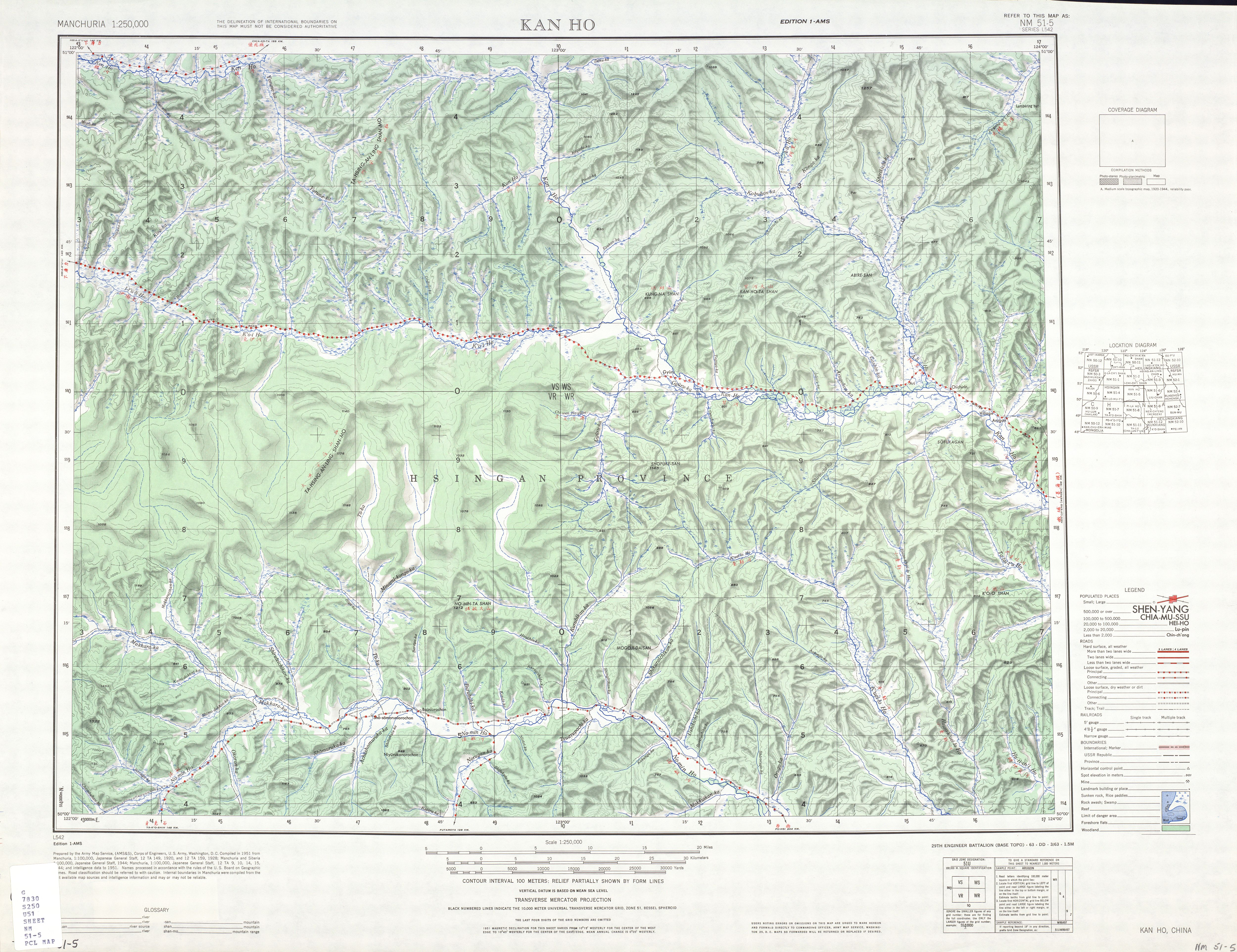
Map including part of Oroqen Autonomous Banner (AMS, 1951)

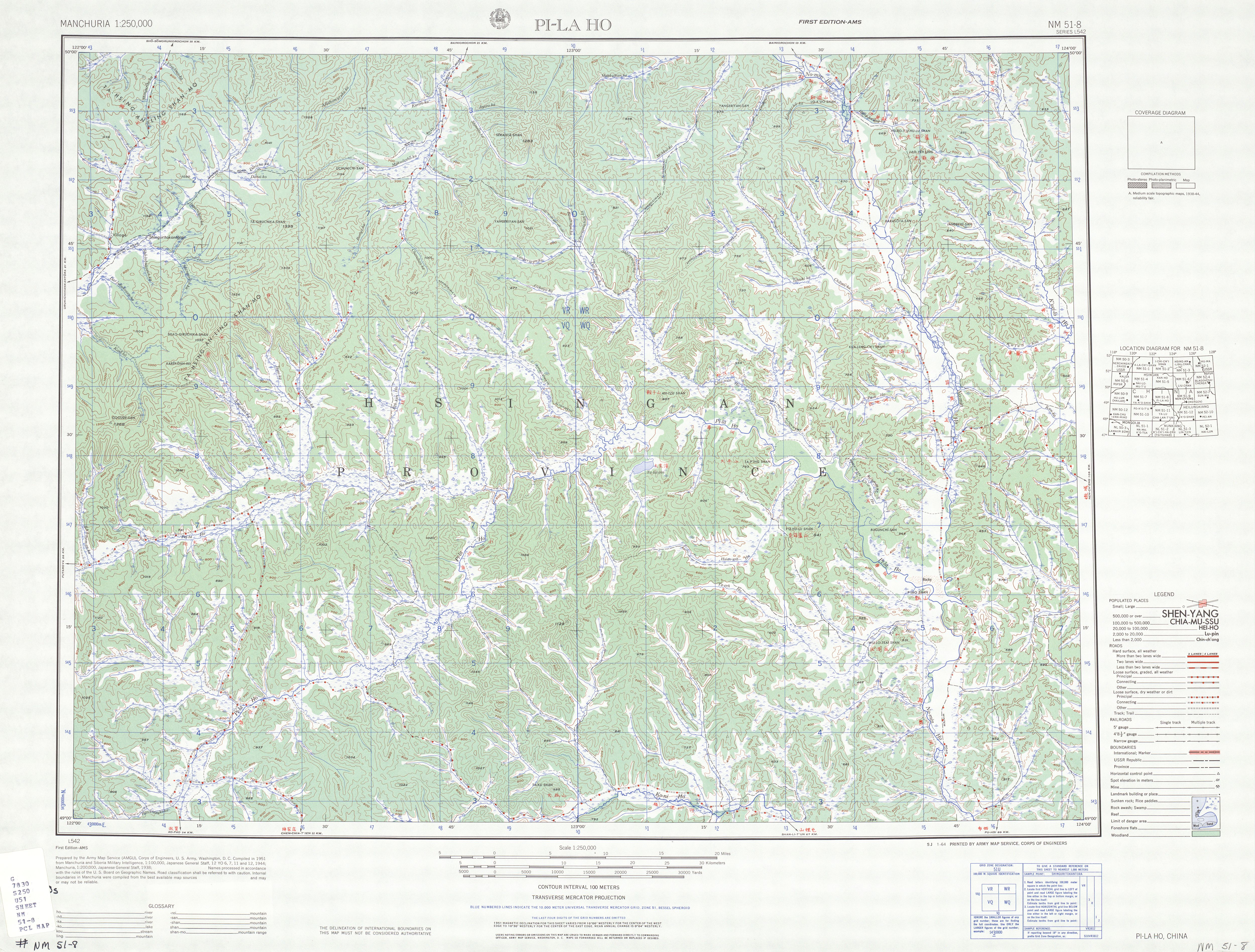
Map including part of Oroqen Autonomous Banner (AMS, 1951)

== Ethnic groups in Oroqen Autonomous Banner, 2000 census ==
Nationality	Population	Percentage
Han	257,861	88.28%
Mongols	12,045	4.12%
Manchu	8,743	2.99%
Daur	6,379	2.18%
Evenks	3,155	1.08%
Oroqen	2,050	0.7%
Hui	1,038	0.36%
Korean	633	0.22%
Xibe	54	0.02%
Russians	37	0.01%
Others	102	0.04%

== Climate ==
Climate data for Oroqen Autonomous Banner, elevation 424 m (1,391 ft), (1991–2020 normals, extremes 1981–2010)
Month	Jan	Feb	Mar	Apr	May	Jun	Jul	Aug	Sep	Oct	Nov	Dec	Year
Record high °C (°F)	−0.7 (30.7)	6.4 (43.5)	18.4 (65.1)	29.0 (84.2)	34.8 (94.6)	40.5 (104.9)	37.2 (99.0)	36.0 (96.8)	31.9 (89.4)	26.5 (79.7)	13.6 (56.5)	0.4 (32.7)	40.5 (104.9)
Mean daily maximum °C (°F)	−13.7 (7.3)	−7.9 (17.8)	0.4 (32.7)	10.7 (51.3)	19.2 (66.6)	24.8 (76.6)	26.5 (79.7)	24.3 (75.7)	18.4 (65.1)	8.5 (47.3)	−5.2 (22.6)	−14.1 (6.6)	7.7 (45.8)
Daily mean °C (°F)	−21.7 (−7.1)	−17.1 (1.2)	−7.8 (18.0)	3.1 (37.6)	11.3 (52.3)	17.1 (62.8)	19.8 (67.6)	17.3 (63.1)	10.1 (50.2)	0.8 (33.4)	−12.5 (9.5)	−21.1 (−6.0)	−0.1 (31.9)
Mean daily minimum °C (°F)	−27.6 (−17.7)	−24.4 (−11.9)	−15.5 (4.1)	−4.3 (24.3)	3.0 (37.4)	9.6 (49.3)	14.0 (57.2)	11.6 (52.9)	3.6 (38.5)	−5.3 (22.5)	−18.2 (−0.8)	−26.4 (−15.5)	−6.7 (20.0)
Record low °C (°F)	−40.3 (−40.5)	−39.6 (−39.3)	−31.8 (−25.2)	−21.7 (−7.1)	−8.4 (16.9)	−4.2 (24.4)	1.7 (35.1)	−1.3 (29.7)	−7.9 (17.8)	−23.6 (−10.5)	−34.3 (−29.7)	−40.2 (−40.4)	−40.3 (−40.5)
Average precipitation mm (inches)	3.4 (0.13)	3.2 (0.13)	6.1 (0.24)	18.5 (0.73)	47.0 (1.85)	95.3 (3.75)	168.7 (6.64)	118.5 (4.67)	64.1 (2.52)	21.5 (0.85)	9.8 (0.39)	6.4 (0.25)	562.5 (22.15)
Average precipitation days (≥ 0.1 mm)	5.5	3.6	4.8	6.4	10.8	14.6	17.0	15.4	10.6	6.6	6.3	7.1	108.7
Average snowy days	7.9	5.9	6.9	6.6	1.0	0.1	0	0	0.6	5.2	8.5	9.7	52.4
Average relative humidity (%)	67	62	54	49	52	69	78	80	72	61	67	70	65
Mean monthly sunshine hours	173.3	210.3	266.4	251.5	250.2	241.3	221.6	216.4	213.9	201.4	167.7	149.8	2,563.8
Percentage possible sunshine	65	73	72	60	52	49	45	49	57	62	63	61	59
Source: China Meteorological Administration

Climate data for Nuomin Town (Xiaoergou), Oroqen Autonomous Banner (1991–2020 normals)
Month	Jan	Feb	Mar	Apr	May	Jun	Jul	Aug	Sep	Oct	Nov	Dec	Year
Mean daily maximum °C (°F)	−13.6 (7.5)	−7.4 (18.7)	1.5 (34.7)	12.2 (54.0)	20.6 (69.1)	25.7 (78.3)	27.5 (81.5)	25.2 (77.4)	19.6 (67.3)	10.1 (50.2)	−3.3 (26.1)	−13.2 (8.2)	8.7 (47.8)
Daily mean °C (°F)	−23.0 (−9.4)	−17.7 (0.1)	−6.9 (19.6)	4.5 (40.1)	12.7 (54.9)	18.5 (65.3)	21.2 (70.2)	18.5 (65.3)	11.5 (52.7)	2.3 (36.1)	−10.8 (12.6)	−21.3 (−6.3)	0.8 (33.4)
Mean daily minimum °C (°F)	−29.7 (−21.5)	−26.0 (−14.8)	−15.0 (5.0)	−3.1 (26.4)	4.4 (39.9)	11.4 (52.5)	15.5 (59.9)	13.1 (55.6)	4.9 (40.8)	−4.1 (24.6)	−16.8 (1.8)	−27.2 (−17.0)	−6.0 (21.1)
Average precipitation mm (inches)	3.6 (0.14)	3.2 (0.13)	6.0 (0.24)	20.1 (0.79)	41.8 (1.65)	102.2 (4.02)	146.0 (5.75)	116.0 (4.57)	55.9 (2.20)	23.2 (0.91)	6.7 (0.26)	5.8 (0.23)	530.5 (20.89)
Average precipitation days (≥ 0.1 mm)	4.9	3.5	4.5	6.2	9.5	13.6	15.0	13.4	9.4	5.8	4.8	6.0	96.6
Average snowy days	6.7	5.4	6.6	5.0	0.5	0.1	0	0	0.2	3.9	7.4	8.9	44.7
Average relative humidity (%)	66	62	55	48	51	67	76	79	71	61	66	69	64
Mean monthly sunshine hours	178.2	208.2	260.5	251.4	264.1	260.4	246.1	230.7	222.9	208.8	169.9	150.8	2,652
Percentage possible sunshine	66	72	70	61	55	54	51	53	60	64	63	59	61
Source: China Meteorological Administration
