= Oroqen language =

Tungusic language spoken in Inner Mongolia and Heilongjiang

Oroqen
- Orochon, Oronchon, Olunchun, Elunchun, Ulunchun
- Арутчэн Уркун ɔrɔtʃeen ulguur
- Pronunciation: /arʊtɕʰen urkun/
- Native to: China
- Region: China: Inner Mongolia, Heilongjiang
- Ethnicity: Oroqen
- Native speakers: 3,789 (2009)
- Language family: Tungusic: Northern; Ewenic; Evenki group; Oroqen
- Dialects: Gankui; Selpechen
- Writing system: Latin script

Language codes
- ISO 639-3: orh
- Glottolog: oroq1238
- ELP: Oroqen
- Linguasphere: 44-CAA-bd
- Oroqen is classified as Critically Endangered by the UNESCO Atlas of the World's Languages in Danger.

Oroqen (/ˈɒrətʃɛn, ˈɒroʊ-/ ORR-ə-chen, ORR-oh-; Oroqen Urkun; ɔrɔtʃeen ulguur), also known as Orochon, Oronchon, Olunchun, Elunchun or Ulunchun, is a Northern Tungusic language spoken in the People's Republic of China. Dialects are Gankui and Heilongjiang. Gankui is the standard dialect. It is spoken by the Oroqen people of Inner Mongolia (predominantly the Oroqin Autonomous Banner) and Heilongjiang in Northeast China.

Since the 1980s, Oroqen-language materials were produced by teachers in Oroqen-speaking areas. They based the language's orthography either on IPA or Pinyin. A majority of Oroqen speakers use Chinese as a literary language and some also speak Daur.

== Geographic distribution ==
Oroqen is spoken in the following counties of China:

- Heilongjiang province
  - Da Hinggan Ling: Huma County and Tahe County
  - Heihe: Xunke County
  - Yichun: Jiayin County and Heihe City
- Inner Mongolia Autonomous Region
  - Hulunbuir: Oroqen Autonomous Banner

== Phonology ==
=== Consonants ===
| | | Labial | Alveolar | Post- alveolar | Velar | Glottal |
|---|---|---|---|---|---|---|
| Nasal | | m | n | ɲ | ŋ | |
| Plosive/ Affricate | voiceless | p | t | t͡ʃ | k | |
| Plosive/ Affricate | voiced | b | d | d͡ʒ | ɡ | |
| Fricative | | ɸ | | ʃ | x ~ [ɣ] ~ [h] | |
| Rhotic | | | r | | | |
| Approximant | | | l | j | w | |

- Allophones of /x/ are heard as [ɣ], [h].
- A bilabial /ɸ/ can also be heard as a labio-dental [f].
- A rhotic trill /r/ tends to sound as a tap [ɾ], when occurring word-finally.

=== Vowels ===
| | Front | | Central | Back |
|---|---|---|---|---|
| High | i iː | y | | u uː |
| Near-high | ɪ ɪː | | | ʊ ʊː |
| High-mid | eː | | ə əː | o oː |
| Low-mid | ɛː | | ə əː | ɔ ɔː |
| Low | | | | ɑ ɑː |

- /ə, əː/ are often heard as lower sounds [ɐ, ɐː].
- Short allophones of /o, u/ are heard as [ɵ, ʉ].

== Sample text ==
Listed below are some Oroqen sentences. They are transcribed in Oroqen Phonetic Alphabet.

| Arian has three elder brothers. | Arian ilan axči |
| The children are all come in. | Kúxä səl ku əmčə |
| Arian's elder brother is coming. | Arian axninin əmčə |
| I'm a student. | Pi pite turan |
| You're taller than me | ši mintu gúkta |
| The house is neat and tidy. | Ər jü čaldä le |
| Arian untied the rope | Arian ušixəmúə pudičə |
| How many children do you have? | ši ati kúxa či pišiniʔ |
| Arian took off his clothes | Arian kantaxúə purmə ədəjə |
