= Alchuka language =

Tungusic language

Alchuka
- aʃïxa ash(u)ha
- Region: Heilongjiang Province, northeastern China
- Ethnicity: Alchuka
- Extinct: 1980s
- Language family: Tungusic: Southern; Jurchenic; Alchuka

Language codes
- ISO 639-3: None (mis)
- Glottolog: alec1238
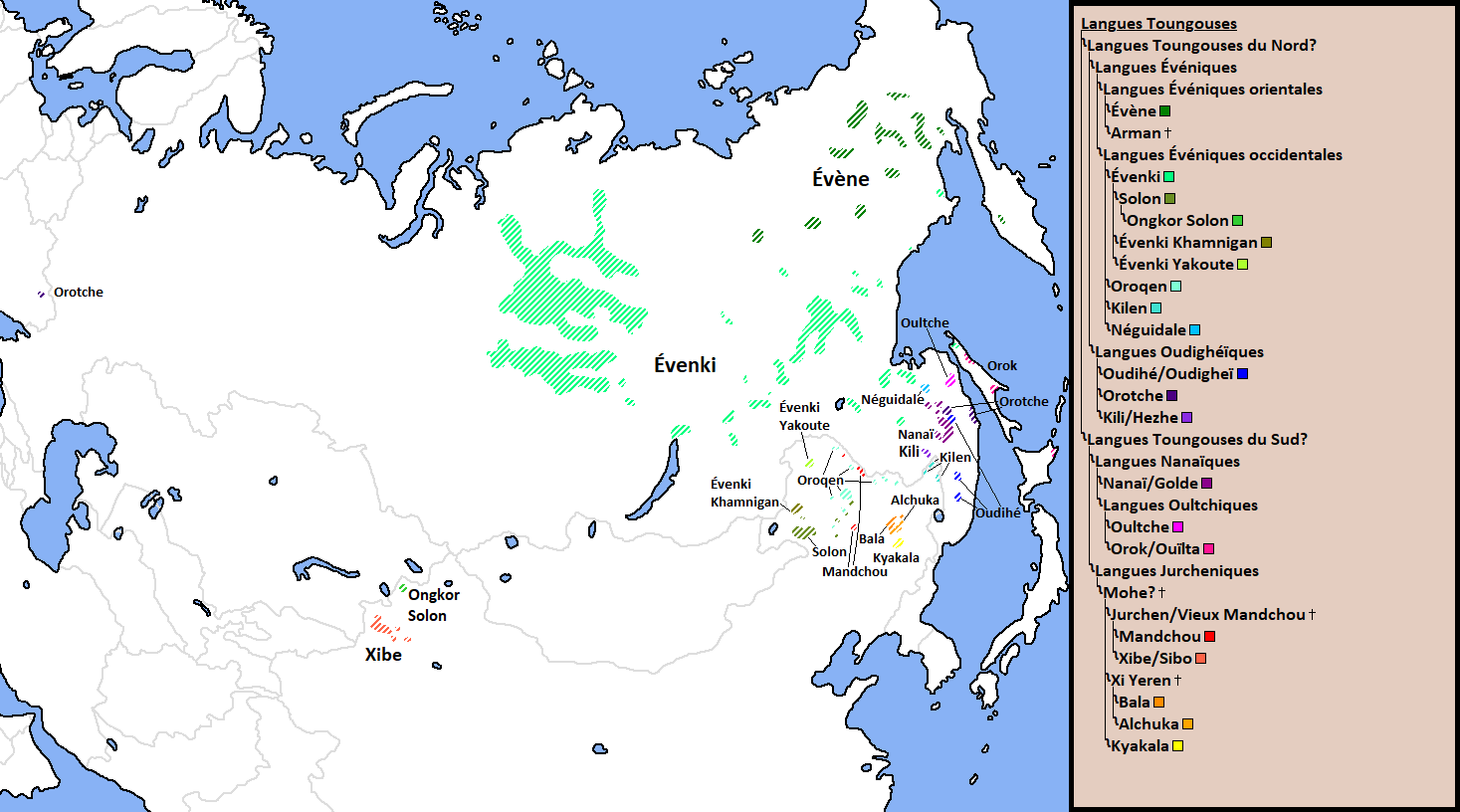
- Map of the Tungusic languages. Alchuka

Alchuka (Chinese: 阿勒楚喀; pinyin: Ālèchǔkā; Manchu: Alcuka, Alcuha), also Alchuka Manchu (Chinese: 阿勒楚喀满语; pinyin: Ālèchǔkā Mǎnyǔ) and the Alchuka dialect of Manchu (Chinese: 满语阿勒楚喀方言; pinyin: Mǎnyǔ Ālèchǔkā fāngyán) is an extinct Tungusic language that was spoken near Harbin in Heilongjiang Province, northeastern China.

A detailed overview of Alchuka can be found in Hölzl (2020).

== Name ==
Alchuka is the historical name of a town, now called Acheng District.

== Classification ==
Alchuka belongs to the Jurchenic subgroup of Tungusic. Other Jurchenic languages include Written Manchu, Bala, and Chinese Kyakala.

== Documentation ==
Alchuka has been documented in the 1980s by Mu Yejun (穆晔骏), in Mu (1981: 72; 1985; 1986a; 1986b; 1987; 1988). At the time, only very few elderly speakers were left.

Alchuka has also been discussed in Ikegami (1994, 1999: 321–343) and Hölzl (2017, 2020).
