= Kyakala language =

Kyakala language may refer to various Tungusic languages belonging to different subgroups:

- Chinese Kyakala language, a Jurchenic language
- Russian Kyakala language, an Udegheic language or dialect cluster
