= Manchu language =

Critically endangered Tungusic language

Manchu
- ᠮᠠᠨᠵᡠ ᡤᡳᠰᡠᠨ Manju gisun
- Manju gisun written in Manchu script
- Native to: China
- Region: Manchuria
- Ethnicity: Manchus
- Native speakers: L1: 20 (2007); L2: Thousands
- Revival: 1980s
- Language family: Tungusic: Southern; Jurchenic; Manchu–Xibe; Manchu
- Early form: Jurchen
- Writing system: Manchu alphabet

Language codes
- ISO 639-2: mnc
- ISO 639-3: mnc
- Glottolog: manc1252
- ELP: Manchu
- Linguasphere: 44-CAA-cb

Manchu (ᠮᠠᠨᠵᡠ ᡤᡳᠰᡠᠨ Manju gisun) is a critically endangered Tungusic language native to the historical region of Manchuria in Northeast China. As the traditional native language of the Manchus, it was the national language of the Qing dynasty (1644–1912) of China, although today the vast majority of Manchus speak only Mandarin Chinese. Several thousand can speak Manchu as a second language through governmental primary education or free classes for adults in classrooms or online.

The Manchu language has high historical value for historians of China, especially for the Qing dynasty. Manchu-language texts supply information that is unavailable in Chinese, and when both Manchu and Chinese versions of a given text exist, they provide controls for understanding the Chinese.

Like most Siberian languages, Manchu is an agglutinative language that demonstrates limited vowel harmony. It has been demonstrated that it is derived mainly from the Jurchen language though there are many loan words from Mongolian and Chinese. Its script is vertically written and taken from the Mongolian script (which in turn derives from Aramaic via Sogdian and then Uyghur). Although Manchu does not have the kind of grammatical gender found in most European languages, some gendered words in Manchu are distinguished by different stem vowels (vowel inflection), as in ama, 'father', and eme, 'mother'.

== Names ==
The Qing dynasty used various Mandarin Chinese expressions to refer to the Manchu language, such as "Qingwen" (清文) and "Qingyu" (清語) ("Qing language"). The term "national" was also applied to writing in Manchu, as in Guowen (國文), in addition to Guoyu (國語) ("national language"), which was used by previous non-Han dynasties to refer to their languages and, in modern times, to the Standard Chinese language. In the Manchu-language version of the Treaty of Nerchinsk, the term "Chinese language" (Dulimbai gurun i bithe) referred to the Chinese, Manchu, and Mongol languages, three separate language groups, not just one language.

== History ==
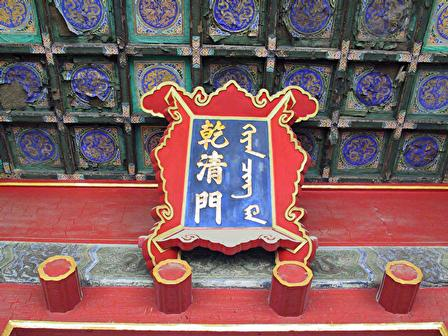
Plaque at the Forbidden City in Beijing, in both Chinese (left, 乾清門; qián qīng mén) and Manchu (right, ᡴᡳᠶᠠᠨ ᠴᡳᠩ ᠮᡝᠨ; kiyan cing men)

Official designation for China in Manchu, reads vertically to the next word to the right: "Dulimbai gurun" (the Central country = China).

=== Monolingualism to bilingualism ===
Manchu is a southern Tungusic language. Whilst Northern Tungus languages such as Evenki retain traditional structure, the Chinese language is a source of major influence upon Manchu, altering its form and vocabulary. It was called the "Qing language" (Qingyu or Qingwen) or the "national language" (guoyu) in Chinese. In Manchu, it was called Manju gisun, the "Manchu language".

While most Manchus eventually lost their ability to speak the Manchu language by the end of the Qing dynasty, the Manchus of the early Qing were predominantly monolingual Manchu speakers. This lasted until the reign of the Shunzhi Emperor (1644–1661). Initially the Eight Banners and military institutions handled affairs exclusively in Manchu. Bannermen, no matter the ethnicity, were expected to be proficient in the Manchu language. In practice there were reports in the early 18th century that Mongol soldiers only understood commands in Mongolian. Manchu was also used in creative works such as poems, songs, and stories.

The Manchus that expanded the Qing dynasty's territory were basically monolingual Manchu speakers. Before 1644, proficiency in Chinese was considered the domain of specialists, and among ordinary Manchu bannermen, knowledge of Chinese, especially written Chinese, was considered unusual. However, most soldiers lacked the ability to write in any language. Only those who were lucky enough to receive formal education in anticipation of a promotion were taught how to write in Manchu. Most of these individuals were stationed in Beijing. It took until the 1670s before familiarity with spoken Chinese eliminated the need to assign Chinese translators for Manchu officials.

The Qing emperors showed concern very early on that learning too much Chinese would threaten Manchu distinctiveness. In 1654, the Shunzhi Emperor proclaimed that the Manchus should stop learning Chinese because it would lead to a gradual loss of Manchu ways. Since Chinese books had been translated into Manchu, Shunzhi reasoned that Manchus could make do with only knowing Manchu. Perhaps due to this proclamation, it was not uncommon for Manchu officials up until the early 18th century to lack the ability to read or write Chinese. However, when an elite bannerman admitted that he did not know Chinese during his time as Gansu's provincial commander, the Kangxi Emperor (r. 1661–1722) reprimanded him for not having a basic understanding of Manchu and Chinese writing. In 1723, a censor complained about the lack of Chinese proficiency among the Manchu staff in the Six Ministries. All documents submitted by the provinces were in Chinese and were reviewed by the Manchu and Chinese departments, but there were Manchus who could not read Chinese. He recommended appointing people who at least knew Chinese to vacancies in the Manchu department. Within a few months, knowledge of Chinese was made a requirement for Manchus in the Grand Secretariat, and in 1725, a requirement for top provincial officials.

The lack of Manchu officials skilled in reading and writing Chinese was brought up again in 1725 and 1735. It was probably not until the 1750s that knowledge of Chinese among top Manchu officials became universal. When the Yongzheng Emperor (r. 1722–1735) sent a message in Chinese to the Xi'an general Yansin, he could not read the letter, and had to distribute the letter in pieces to different people for them to translate in order to maintain secrecy.

=== Decline in the garrisons ===
After the mid-18th century, the Qing court shifted its language policy from promoting Chinese to Manchu. In an effort to preserve the Manchu identity, the imperial government instituted Manchu language classes and examinations for the bannermen, offering rewards to those who excelled in the language. Chinese classics and fiction were translated into Manchu and a body of Manchu literature accumulated. As the Yongzheng Emperor (r. 1722–1735) explained,

"If some special encouragement ... is not offered, the ancestral language will not be passed on and learned."

Despite the imperial court's efforts to preserve the Manchu language, its decline had already been noted among the bannermen in the garrisons by the early 18th century. Language loss seems to have occurred earlier in the provinces than in the capital and was a noted problem even prior to the 1720s. In 1708, the Xi'an garrison general Siju reported that teachers had been assigned to banner soldiers to teach them Manchu and forbid the use of Chinese language. Xi'an was the most Manchu of all the provincial garrisons, so if such measures were necessary there, it is likely that other provincial garrisons experienced greater language loss. When the Yongzheng emperor turned his attention to the garrisons a few years after the start of his reign, he found that Manchu language proficiency was already in serious decline. The Nanjing garrison general Yonggina reported that his 17-year-old son could neither speak or write Manchu with ease. The Ningxia general Sibe noted that officers conducted random inspections on individual archery skills and spoken Manchu. A report from Taiyuan in 1724 said that out of 180 Manchu soldiers on standby, only 87 could both shoot well from horseback and speak Manchu. A 1735 report from Hangzhou stated plainly that only half of the Manchu and Mongol troops could speak Manchu or at least say a few words in reply. Judging by these reports, it is likely that with the exception of Xi'an, half the Manchus stationed in the provincial garrisons had lost the ability to speak Manchu by the 1760s.

One reason why language loss occurred at an accelerated rate in the garrisons compared to the capital was the lack of official schools. In Beijing, schools had been established as early as the Shunzhi reign (1644–1661). The banner commander at Kaifeng, Hesing, reported in 1734 that many of the 300 Manchu youths did not speak Manchu because there was no regular Manchu school. Hesing noted that even finding good teachers to teach Chinese was difficult, and recommended building both a Manchu and Chinese school for young Manchus. Unlike the larger Manchu populations located in Beijing and Xi'an, the small population of the Kaifeng garrison probably found it more expedient to learn Chinese due to a greater need for communication with non-Manchus. In Kaifeng, the Manchus experienced language loss after only a single generation. In Xi'an, it took three to four generations.

=== Decline in the capital ===
In 1726, Yongzheng was furious to find that the newly recruited guards joked around in Chinese and had abandoned their study of the Manchu language. In 1734, the emperor issued an edict ordering all members of the senior and imperial guards, and all guards of the palace gates, to speak only in Manchu and not Chinese. This was ineffective and the palace guards continued to speak in Chinese, even in the presence of the emperor, so another edict on the subject was issued a month later. Such proscriptions did not have a long lasting effect.

A few months after coming to power in 1735, the Qianlong Emperor issued directions for the garrisons at Hangzhou and Jiangning to prepare for training hunts in three years' time. He told the senior staff at Hangzhou that if the soldiers were not able to conduct themselves on horseback and speak and understand Manchu by then, they would be hearing from him. These efforts did not have the desired effect. In 1736, the Manchu vice-president of the Board of Rites, Sioi-yuwan-meng, wrote that Manchu bachelors had started favoring Chinese writing, and if nothing was done the Manchu language would be lost. Even though schools in Beijing taught Manchu, they also taught Chinese as well, and the institutionalization of the translation exams in 1723 also further encouraged proficiency in written Chinese, shifting the linguistic balance in favor of Chinese.

In 1750, the Qianlong Emperor complained that the members of the vanguard spoke Chinese. He criticized Manchus for translating Chinese novels and their attempts at writing Chinese poetry. In 1752, Qianlong jeered at a Manchu official, Nailangga, for presenting him with poetry during a hunt "just like a Chinese". The emperor dismissed Nailangga and publicized the case throughout the Eight Banners as an example of corruption by Han customs. In 1776, Qianlong was shocked to see a Manchu official, Guo'ermin, who did not understand what the emperor was telling him in Manchu, despite coming from the Manchu stronghold of Mukden. Qianlong complained that eleven Manchu officials from the Manchu homeland used only Chinese in their reports. A local commander noted that written works in Manchu were riddled with mistakes.

It is likely that by the end of the 18th century, the Manchu imperial family had lost the fight to preserve the Manchu language. A Jesuit report in the 1720s stated that Manchu was still widely spoken in court whereas a report in the late 18th century declared that only Chinese could be heard in the princes' mansions in Beijing. One contemporary observer claimed that by 1800, practically everyone living in the major urban centers of Manchuria spoke Chinese while only Manchus who lived in tight knit communities continued to speak their native language. By the 19th century, even the imperial court had lost fluency in the language. The Jiaqing Emperor (reigned 1796–1820) complained that his officials were not proficient at understanding or writing Manchu.

=== Late stage decline ===
By the end of the 19th century, the language had declined to such an extent that even at the office of the Shengjing general (Manchuria), the only documents written in Manchu (rather than Chinese) would be the memorials wishing the emperor long life; during the same period, the archives of the Hulan banner detachment in Heilongjiang show that only 1% of the bannermen could read Manchu and no more than 0.2% could speak it. Banner-family genealogies switched from Manchu to Chinese records and one bannerman's cousin, Fuhai, was noted to have only understood Chinese with the exception of a few Manchu words. In 1870, the Scottish missionary Alexander Williamson observed that only some of the elderly Manchus in Fengtian still spoke Manchu. In the 1890s, the British consular official Alexander Hosie asserted after taking a tour of the northeast that "the Manchu language... is to all intents and purposes a thing of the past" with the exception of remote corners of Jilin and Heilongjiang where isolated Tartar tribes lived. Nonetheless, as late as 1906–1907, Qing education and military officials insisted that schools teach Manchu language and that the officials testing soldiers' marksmanship continue to conduct an oral examination in Manchu. In 1909, Mandarin Chinese (Beijing dialect) was officially designated as the national language by the Qing government.

The translation exams held for the bannermen declined to less than 10 graduates in the early 19th century due to a lack of candidates. The exam itself did not actually test translation for the most part, and test material consisted of the Manchu or Mongolian versions of the Four Books and Five Classics. Only a minor part of the exam tested translation from Chinese to Manchu or Mongolian. There were three levels to the exam and no palace level examination. There was a provincial quota of 33 persons for the Manchu exam and 9 persons for the Mongolian exam. However, by 1828 there were only 7 and 3 graduates respectively, and 4 and 1 in 1837. The Mongolian exam was abolished in 1840 because there were only 6 candidates.

The use of the language for the official documents declined throughout Qing history as well. In particular, at the beginning of the dynasty, some documents on sensitive political and military issues were submitted in Manchu but not in Chinese. The Manchu language never completely disappeared during the Qing dynasty. Imperial records in Manchu continued to be produced until the last years of the dynasty.

In 1912, when the Qing was overthrown, most Manchus could not speak their language, and the Beijing dialect had already replaced Manchu. The last emperor of China, Puyi, had studied the Manchu language for years, but claimed that it was his worst subject and even after so many years, he knew only a single Manchu word, "yili", meaning arise. It was the word he used when his Manchu ministers knelt before him in audience.

According to a 1990 census report, there were 9,821,180 Manchus in China but less than 100 Manchus were native Manchu speakers and they were all advanced in age.

=== Use of Manchu ===
A large number of Manchu documents remain in the archives, important for the study of Qing-era China. Today, written Manchu can still be seen on architecture inside the Forbidden City, whose historical signs are written in both Chinese and Manchu. Another limited use of the language was for voice commands in the Qing army, attested as late as 1878.

Bilingual Chinese-Manchu inscriptions appeared on many things.

=== Manchu studies during the Qing dynasty ===
A Jiangsu Han Chinese named Shen Qiliang wrote books on Manchu grammar, including Guide to Qing Books (清書指南; Manju bithe jy nan) and Great Qing Encyclopedia (大清全書; Daicing gurun-i yooni bithe). His father was a naval officer for the Qing and his grandfather was an official of the Ming dynasty before rebels murdered him. Shen Qiliang himself fought against the Three Feudatories as part of the Qing army. He then started learning Manchu and writing books on Manchu grammar from Bordered Yellow Manchu Bannermen in 1677 after moving to Beijing. He translated the Hundred Family Names and Thousand Character Classic into Manchu and spent 25 years on the Manchu language. Shen wrote: "I am a Han. But all my life I have made a hobby of Manchu." Shen did not have to learn Manchu as part of his job because he was never an official, so he seems to have studied it voluntarily. Most Han people were not interested in learning non-Han languages, so it is not known why Shen was doing it, but he did praise Manchu writing, saying that it was simpler and clearer than Chinese.

A Hangzhou Han Chinese, Chen Mingyuan, helped edit the book Introduction to the Qing language (清文啟蒙; Cing wen ki meng bithe), which was co-written by a Manchu named Uge. Uge gave private Manchu language classes, which were attended by his friend Chen. Chen arranged for its printing.

==== Hanlin ====
Han Chinese at the Hanlin Academy studied the Manchu language in the Qing. The Han Chinese Hanlin graduate Qi Yunshi knew the Manchu language and wrote a book in Chinese on the frontier regions of China by translating and using the Manchu-language sources in the Grand Secretariat's archives. In 1740, Hanlin Academy expelled the Han Chinese Yuan Mei for not succeeding in his Manchu studies. Injišan, and Ortai, both Manchus, funded his work. The Han Chinese Yan Changming had the ability to read Tibetan, Oirat, and Mongolian. Han Chinese officials learned languages on the frontier regions and Manchu in order to be able to write and compile their writings on the region.

A Manchu-language course over three years was required for the highest ranking Han degree holders from Hanlin but not all Han literati were required to study Manchu. Towards the end of the Qing it was pointed out that a lot of Bannermen themselves did not know Manchu anymore and that, in retrospect, "the founding emperors of the (Qing) dynasty (had been) unable to coerce the country's ministers and people to learn the national writing and national speech (Manchu)".

==== Translation between Chinese and Manchu ====
Chinese fiction books were translated into Manchu. Bannermen wrote fiction in the Chinese language. Huang Taiji had Chinese books translated into Manchu. Han Chinese and Manchus helped Jesuits write and translate books into Manchu and Chinese. Manchu books were published in Beijing.

The Qianlong Emperor commissioned projects such as new Manchu dictionaries, both monolingual and multilingual like the Pentaglot. Among his directives were to eliminate directly borrowed loanwords from Chinese and replace them with calque translations which were put into new Manchu dictionaries. This showed in the titles of Manchu translations of Chinese works during his reign which were direct translations contrasted with Manchu books translated during the Kangxi Emperor's reign which were Manchu transliterations of the Chinese characters.

The Pentaglot was based on the Yuzhi Siti Qing Wenjian (御製四體清文鑑; "Imperially-Published Four-Script Textual Mirror of Qing"), with Uyghur added as a fifth language. The four-language version of the dictionary with Tibetan was in turn based on an earlier three-language version with Manchu, Mongolian, and Chinese called the "Imperially-Published Manchu Mongol Chinese Three pronunciation explanation mirror of Qing" (御製滿珠蒙古漢字三合切音清文鑑), which was in turn based on the "Imperially-Published Revised and Enlarged mirror of Qing" (御製增訂清文鑑) in Manchu and Chinese, which used both Manchu script to transcribe Chinese words and Chinese characters to transcribe Manchu words with fanqie.

==== Studies by outsiders ====
A number of European scholars in the 18th century were frustrated by the difficulties in reading Chinese, with its "complicated" writing system and classical writing style. They considered Manchu translations, or parallel Manchu versions, of many Chinese documents and literary works very helpful for understanding the original Chinese. De Moyriac de Mailla (1669–1748) benefited from the existence of the parallel Manchu text when translating the historical compendium Tongjian Gangmu (Tung-chien Kang-mu; 資治通鑒綱目). Jean Joseph Amiot, a Jesuit scholar, consulted Manchu translations of Chinese works as well, and wrote that the Manchu language "would open an easy entrance to penetrate ... into the labyrinth of Chinese literature of all ages."

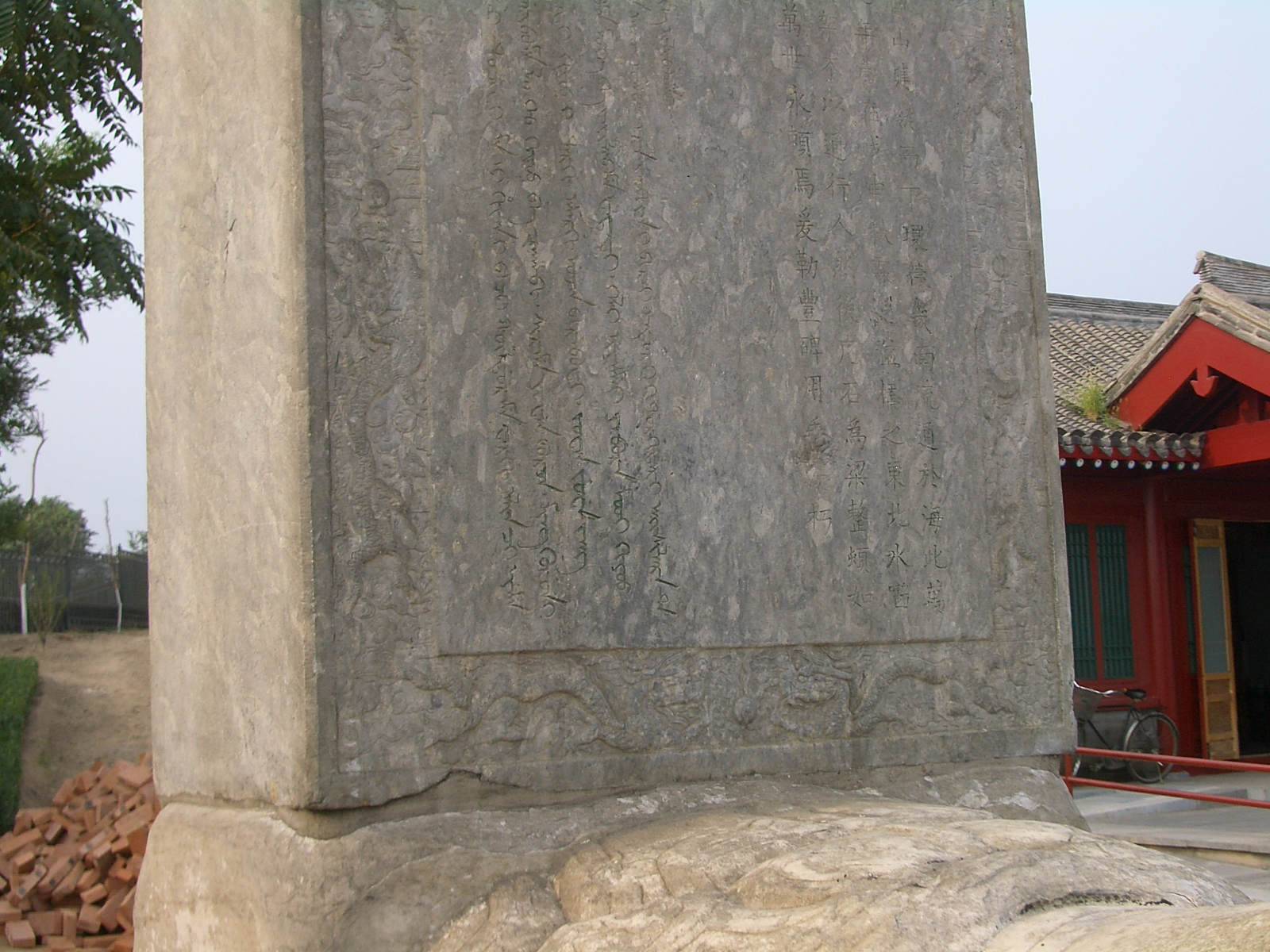
The Kangxi Emperor's stele near Lugou Bridge, with parallel Chinese and Manchu text

Study of the Manchu language by Russian sinologists started in the early 18th century, soon after the founding of the Russian Orthodox Mission in Beijing, to which most early Russian sinologists were connected. Illarion Kalinovich Rossokhin (died 1761) translated a number of Manchu works, such as The history of Kangxi's conquest of the Khalkha and Oirat nomads of the Great Tartary, in five parts (История о завоевании китайским ханом Канхием калкаского и элетского народа, кочующего в Великой Татарии, состоящая в пяти частях), as well as some legal treatises and a Manchu–Chinese dictionary. In the late 1830s, Georgy M. Rozov translated from Manchu the History of the Jin (Jurchen) Dynasty. A school to train Manchu language translators was started in Irkutsk in the 18th century, and existed for a fairly long period.

An anonymous author remarked in 1844 that the transcription of Chinese words in Manchu alphabet, available in the contemporary Chinese–Manchu dictionaries, was more useful for learning the pronunciation of Chinese words than the inconsistent romanizations used at the time by the writers transcribing Chinese words in English or French books.

In 1930, the German sinologist Erich Hauer argued forcibly that knowing Manchu allows the scholar to render Manchu personal and place names that have been "horribly mutilated" by their Chinese transliterations and to know the meanings of the names. He goes on that the Manchu translations of Chinese classics and fiction were done by experts familiar with their original meaning and with how best to express it in Manchu, such as in the Manchu translation of the Peiwen yunfu. Because Manchu is not difficult to learn, it "enables the student of Sinology to use the Manchu versions of the classics [...] in order to verify the meaning of the Chinese text".

== Current situation ==
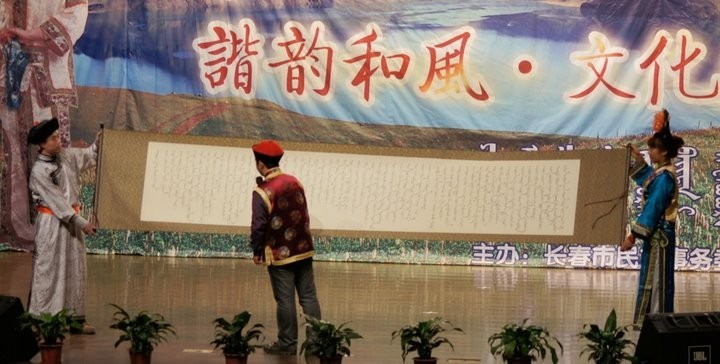
"Banjin Inenggi" and Manchu linguistic activity by the government and students in Changchun, 2011

Currently, several thousand people can speak Manchu as a second language through primary education or free classes for adults offered in China. However very few native Manchu speakers remain. In what used to be Manchuria virtually no one speaks the language, the entire area having been completely sinicized. As of 2007, the last native speakers of the language were thought to be 18 octogenarian residents of the village of Sanjiazi (Manchu: ᡳᠯᠠᠨ
ᠪᠣᡠ᠋, Möllendorff: ilan boo, Abkai: ilan bou), in Fuyu County, in Qiqihar, Heilongjiang Province. A few speakers also remain in Dawujia village in Aihui District of Heihe Prefecture.

The Xibe (or Sibe) are often considered to be the modern custodians of the written Manchu language. The Xibe live in Qapqal Xibe Autonomous County near the Ili valley in Xinjiang, having been moved there by the Qianlong Emperor in 1764. Modern written Xibe is very close to Manchu, although there are slight differences in the writing system which reflect distinctive Xibe pronunciation. More significant differences exist in morphological and syntactic structure of the spoken Xibe language. For one example among many, there is a "converb" ending, -mak, that is very common in modern spoken Xibe but unknown in Manchu.

=== Revitalization movements ===
Since the 1980s, there have been increased efforts to revive the Manchu language. Revival movements are linked to the reconstruction of ethnic Manchu identity in the Han-dominated country. The Manchus mainly lead the revival efforts, with support from the PRC state, NGOs and international efforts.

Revivalism began in the post-Mao era when non-Han ethnic expression was allowed. By the 1980s, Manchus had become the second largest minority group in China. People began to reveal their ethnic identities that had been hidden due to 20th century unrests and the fall of the Qing Empire.

Language revival was one method the growing numbers of Manchus used in order to reconstruct their lost ethnic identity. Language represented them and set them apart from other minority groups in the "plurality of ethnic cultures within one united culture". Another reason for revivalism lay in the archives of the Qing Empire—a way to translate and resolve historical conflicts between the Manchus and the state. Lastly, the people wanted to regain their language for the rituals and communication to their ancestors—many shamans do not understand the words they use.

Manchu associations can be found across the country, including Hong Kong, as well as Taiwan, which is under the administration of the Republic of China. Consisting of mostly Manchus and Mongols, they act as the link between the people, their ethnic leaders and the state.

NGOs provide large support through Manchu classes. Manchu is now taught in certain primary schools as well as in universities. Heilongjiang University Manchu language research center in no.74, Xuefu Road, Harbin, listed Manchu as an academic major. It is taught there as a tool for reading Qing-dynasty archival documents. In 2009 The Wall Street Journal reported that the language is offered (as an elective) in one university, one public middle school, and a few private schools. There are also other Manchu volunteers in many places of China who freely teach Manchu in the desire to rescue the language. Thousands of non-Manchu speakers have learned the language through these measures. Despite the efforts of NGOs, they tend to lack support from high-level government and politics.

The state also runs programs to revive minority cultures and languages. Deng Xiaoping promoted bilingual education. However, many programs are not suited to the ethnic culture or to passing knowledge to the younger generations. If the programs were created via "top-down political processes" the locals tend to look at them with distrust. But if they were formed via specialized governmental organizations, they fare better. According to Katarzyna Golik:

In Mukden, the historical Manchurian capital, there is a Shenyang Manchu Association (沈阳市满族联谊会) which is active in promoting Manchurian culture. The Association publishes books about Manchurian folklore and history and its activities are run independently from the local government. Among the various classes of the Manchurian language and calligraphy some turned out to be a success. Beijing has the biggest and most wealthy Beijing Daxing Regency Manchu Association (北京大兴御苑满族联谊会). (pp100-101)

Other support can be found internationally and on the Internet. Post-Cultural Revolution reform allowed for international studies to be done in China. The dying language and ethnic culture of Manchus gained attention, providing local support. Websites facilitate communication of language classes or articles. Younger generations also spread and promote their unique identity through popular Internet media.

Despite the increased efforts to revive the Manchu language, there are many obstacles standing in the way. Even with increased awareness, many Manchus choose to give up their language, some opting to learn Mongolian instead. Manchu language is still thought of as a foreign language in a Han-dominated Chinese speaking country. Obstacles are also found when gaining recognition from the state. Resistance through censorship prevented the performing of Banjin festivals, a festival in recognition of a new reconstructed Manchu identity, in Beijing.

== Dialects ==
Dialects of Manchu include a variety of its historical and remaining spoken forms throughout Manchuria, and the city of Beijing (the capital). Notable historical Manchu dialects include Beijing, Ningguta, Alchuka and Mukden dialects.

=== Beijing Manchu dialect ===
Many of the Manchu words are now pronounced with some Chinese peculiarities of pronunciation, so k before i and e=ch', g before i and e=ch, h and s before i=hs, etc. H before a, o, u, ū, is the guttural Scotch or German ch.

— A Manchu Grammar: With Analysed Texts, Paul Georg von Möllendorff, p. 1.

The Chinese Northern Mandarin dialect spoken in Beijing had a major influence on the phonology of the dialect of Manchu spoken in that city, and because Manchu phonology was transcribed into Chinese and European sources based on the sinicized pronunciation of Manchus from Beijing, the original authentic Manchu pronunciation is unknown to scholars.

The Manchus of Beijing were influenced by the Chinese dialect spoken in the area to the point where pronouncing Manchu sounds was hard for them, and they pronounced Manchu according to Chinese phonetics, whereas the Manchus of Aigun (in Heilongjiang) could both pronounce Manchu sounds properly and mimic the sinicized pronunciation of Manchus in Beijing, because they learned the Beijingese pronunciation from either studying in Beijing or from officials sent to Aigun from Beijing, and they could tell them apart, using the Chinese influenced Beijingese pronunciation when demonstrating that they were better educated or their superior stature in society.

==== Changes in vowels ====
Phonetically, there are some characteristics that differentiate the Beijing accent from the standard spelling form of Manchu.

- There are some occasional vowel changes in a word. For example ᠴᡳᠮᠠᡵᡳ (cimari /t͡ʃʰimari/) is pronounced [t͡ʃʰumari], ᠣᠵᠣᡵᠠᡴᡡ (ojorakū /ot͡ʃoraqʰʊ/) is pronounced [ot͡ɕiraqʰʊ], and ᡤᡳᠰᡠᠨ (gisun /kisun/) is pronounced [kysun].
  - In particular, when the vowel /o/ or diphthong /oi/ appears at the beginning of a word, it is frequently pronounced [ə] and [əi] respectively in Beijing accent. For example, ᠣᠩᡤᠣᠯᠣ (onggolo /oŋŋolo/) is pronounced [əŋŋolo], ᠣᡳᠯᠣ (oilo /oilo/) is pronounced [əilo].
- Diphthongization of vowels. /ə/ becomes /əi/ (such as ᡩᡝᡥᡳ dehi /təxi/ pronounced [təixi]), /a/ becomes [ai] (such as ᡩᠠᡤᡳᠯᠠᠮᠪᡳ dagilambi /takilampi/ pronounced [taikilami]), and /i/ becomes [iu] (such as ᠨᡳᡵᡠ niru /niru/ pronounced [niuru], and ᠨᡳᠴᡠᡥᡝ nicuhe /nit͡ʃʰuxə/ pronounced [niut͡ʃʰuxə]).
- /oi/ becomes [uai], especially after /q/ (g). For example, ᡤᠣᡳ᠌ᠮᠪᡳ goimbi /koimpi/ becomes [kuaimi].
- Loss of vowels under certain conditions. The vowel /i/ following consonant /t͡ʃʰ/ (c) or /t͡ʃ/ (j) usually disappears. For example, ᡝᠴᡳᡴᡝ ecike /ət͡ʃʰikʰə/ is pronounced [ət͡ʃʰkʰə], and ᡥᠣᠵᡳᡥᠣᠨ hojihon /χot͡ʃiχon/ is pronounced [χot͡ʃχon]. There are also other cases where a vowel disappears in Beijing accent. For example, ᡝᡴᡧᡝᠮᠪᡳ ekšembi /əkʰʃəmpi/ is pronounced [əkʰʃmi], and ᠪᡠᡵᡠᠯᠠᠮᠪᡳ burulambi /purulampi/ is pronounced [purlami].

==== Changes in consonants ====
This section is primarily based upon Aisin Gioro Yingsheng's Miscellaneous Knowledge of Manchu (满语杂识).

- Systemic merger of /q/ and /χ/ into [ʁ], and /k/ and /x/ into [ɣ] between voiced phonemes. For example, ᠰᠠᡵᡤᠠᠨ (sargan /sɑrqɑn/) is pronounced as [sɑrʁɑn], and ᡠᡵᡤᡠᠨ (urgun /urkun/) is pronounced as [urɣun].
- Conversely, /χ/ may be pronounced as [qʰ] at the beginning of a word. For example, ᡥᠠᠮᡳᠮᠪᡳ (hamimbi /χɑmimpi/) is pronounced as [qʰamimi].
- Assmilation of alveolar and postalveolar stops after /n/. For example, ᠪᠠᠨᠵᡳᠮᠪᡳ (banjimbi /pɑnt͡ʃimpi/) is pronounced as [pɑnnimi], and ᡥᡝᠨᡩᡠᠮᠪᡳ (hendumbi /xəntumpi/) is pronounced as [xənnumi].
- /si/ is pronounced as [ʃɨ] in the middle of a word. For example, ᡠᠰᡳᡥᠠ (usiha /usiχɑ/) is pronounced as [uʃɨʁɑ].

== Phonology ==
In Manchu, words cannot begin or end with consonant clusters, but consonant clusters can appear word-medially and cross-syllabically, as in akdan 'trust' and orhoda 'ginseng'. Syllables may be of the form CV (open), VC or CVC (closed), where 'C' represents a consonant and 'V' represents a vowel. Several sounds, for example /ŋ k r s/, do not appear as codas in native words except for in onomatopoeia. In Literary Manchu, the most common word-final coda is /n/.

=== Consonants ===
		Labial	Dental	Palatal	Velar
Nasal		m ⟨m⟩	n ⟨n⟩	ɲ ⟨ni⟩	ŋ ⟨ng⟩
Plosive	unaspirated	p ⟨b⟩	t ⟨d⟩	tʃ ⟨j⟩	k ⟨g⟩
Plosive	aspirated	pʰ ⟨p⟩	tʰ ⟨t⟩	tʃʰ ⟨c⟩	kʰ ⟨k⟩
Fricative		f ⟨f⟩	s ⟨s⟩	ʃ ⟨š⟩	x ⟨h⟩
Rhotic			r ⟨r⟩		
Approximant			l ⟨l⟩	j ⟨y⟩	w ⟨w⟩

Manchu has twenty consonants, shown in the table using each phoneme's representation in the IPA, followed by its romanization in italics. /pʰ/ was rare and found mostly in loanwords and onomatopoeiae, such as pak pik ('pow pow'). Historically, /p/ appears to have been common, but changed over time to /f/. /ŋ/ was also found mostly in loanwords and onomatopoeiae and there was no single letter in the Manchu alphabet to represent it, but rather a digraph of the letters for /n/ and /k/. [ɲ] is usually transcribed with a digraph ni, and has thus often been considered a sequence of phonemes /nj/ rather than a phoneme of its own, though work in Tungusic historical linguistics suggests that the Manchu palatal nasal has a very long history as a single segment, and so it is shown here as phonemic.

Early Western descriptions of Manchu phonology labeled Manchu b as "soft p", Manchu d as "soft t", and Manchu g as "soft k", whereas Manchu p was "hard p", t was "hard t", and k was "hard k". This suggests that the phonological contrast between the so-called voiced series (b, d, j, g) and the voiceless series (p, t, c, k) in Manchu as it was spoken during the early modern era was actually one of aspiration (as shown here) or tenseness, as in Mandarin.

/s/ was affricated to [ts] in some or all contexts. /tʃʰ/, /tʃ/, and /ʃ/ together with /s/ were palatalized before /i/ or /y/ to [tɕʰ], [tɕ], and [ɕ], respectively. /kʰ/, /k/ and /x/ were backed before /a/, /ɔ/, or /ʊ/ to [qʰ], [q], and [χ] respectively. Some scholars analyse these uvular realizations as belonging to phonemes separate from /kʰ/ and /k/, and they were distinguished in the Manchu alphabet, but are not distinguished in the romanization.

=== Vowels ===
Vowels of Manchu

	Front	Central	Back
High	i ⟨i⟩		u ⟨u⟩
Mid-high			ʊ ⟨ū⟩
Mid		ə~ɤ ⟨e⟩	ɔ ⟨o⟩
Low		ɑ ⟨a⟩	

The vowel ⟨e⟩ (generally pronounced like Mandarin [ɤ]) is pronounced as [e] after ⟨y⟩, as in niyengniyeri /ɲeŋɲeri/.

Between n and y, i is absorbed into both consonants as /ɲ/.

The relatively rare vowel transcribed ū (pronounced [ʊ]) was usually found as a back vowel; however, in some cases, it was found occurring along with the front vowel e. Much disputation exists over the exact pronunciation of ū. Erich Hauer, a German sinologist and Manchurist, proposes that it was pronounced as a front rounded vowel initially, but a back unrounded vowel medially. William Austin suggests that it was a mid-central rounded vowel. The modern Xibe pronounce it identically to u.

==== Diphthongs ====
There are altogether eighteen diphthongs and six triphthongs. The diphthongs are ai, ao, ei, eo, ia, ie, ii, io, iu, oi, oo, ua, ue, ui, uo, ūa, ūe, ūi, and ūo. The triphthongs are ioa, ioo (which is pronounced as /joː/), io(w)an, io(w)en, ioi (/y/), and i(y)ao, and they exist in Chinese loanwords.

The diphthong oo is pronounced as /oː/, and the diphthong eo is pronounced as /ɤo/.

==== Stress ====
Stress in Manchu has been described in very different ways by different scholars. According to Paul Georg von Möllendorff (1892), it was always on the last syllable. In contrast, Ivan Zakharov (1879) gives numerous specific rules: on the one hand, he seems to say that every prosodic word lent slight prominence to the vowel of its first syllable by lengthening it, but on the other hand suffixes such as the case markers and the interrogative particles received stress, as did the perfect participle suffix and the optative suffix when these forms have future meaning. In the closely related Xibe, Jerry Norman (1974) found yet another system – stress was usually penultimate (rarely antepenultimate) in the stem and was not affected by the addition of suffixes, except for monosyllabic suffixes beginning in a voiceless sound, which were treated as part of the stem for the purposes of stress placement. Disyllabic suffixes sometimes had secondary stress of their own.

=== Loanwords ===
Manchu absorbed a large number of non-native sounds into the language from Chinese. There were special symbols used to represent the vowels of Chinese loanwords. These sounds are believed to have been pronounced as such, as they never occurred in native words. Among these, was the symbol for the high unrounded vowel (customarily romanized with a y, /ɨ/) found in words such as sy (Buddhist temple) and Sycuwan (Sichuan); and the triphthong ioi which is used for the Chinese ü sound. Chinese affricates were also represented with consonant symbols that were only used with loanwords such as in the case of dzengse (orange) (Chinese: chéngzi) and tsun (inch) (Chinese: cùn). In addition to the vocabulary that was borrowed from Chinese, such as the word pingguri (apple) (Chinese: píngguǒ), the Manchu language also had a large number of loanwords from other languages such as Mongolian, for example the words morin (horse) and temen (camel).

=== Vowel harmony ===
A crucial feature of the Manchu language is vowel harmony. It is described as based on the opposition between back and front vowels, but these phonological natural classes differ from the actual phonetic realization. The vowels a, o, ū function as back, as expected, but the only phonologically front vowel is e (even though it is phonetically central). Finally, the vowels i and u function as "neutral" vowels for the purposes of vowel harmony. As a rule, back and front vowels cannot co-occur in a word: in other words, the lone front vowel never occurs in a word with any the regular back vowels (a, o, ū). (An exception is the diphthong eo, which does occur in some words, i.e. deo, "younger brother", geo, "a mare", jeo, "department", leole, "to discuss", leose, "building", and šeole, "to embroider", "to collect".) In contrast, the neutral vowels i and u are free to occur in a word with any other vowel or vowels.

The form of suffixes often varies depending on the rules of vowel harmony. Certain suffixes have only one form and are not affected by vowel harmony (e.g. de); these include the suffixes of the accusative, dative-locative and alternate ablative cases (be, de, deri), the suffix for the imperfect converb (-me) and the nominalizers (-ngge, -ningge and ba). Others have two forms (giyan/giyen, hiyan/hiyen, kiyan/kiyen), one of which is added to front-vowel stems and the other to back-vowel stems. Finally, there are also suffixes with three forms, either a/e/o (e.g. han/hen/hon) or o/ū/u (e.g. hon/hūn/hun). These are used in accordance with the following scheme:

Stem	Suffix	Example
a – a	a	wakalan "guilt"
i – a	a	cihalan "will"
u – a	a	tusangga "useful"
a – i	a	faksikan "work of art"
a – u	a	kuralan "reciprocation"
o – i	a	moringga "horseman"
e – e	e	helmehen "spider"
i – e	e	ildehe "tree bast"
u – e	e	tubehe "salmon"
e – i	e	esihe "fish soup"
e – u	e	erulen "punishment"
o – o	o	doloron "rite"
o – i	o	hojihon "stepson"
a – i	ū	wasihūn "downwards"
e – i	u	wesihun "upwards"

The vowel harmony was traditionally described in terms of the philosophy of the I Ching. Syllables with front vowels were described as being as "yin" syllables whereas syllables with back vowels were called "yang" syllables. The reasoning behind this was that the language had a kind of sound symbolism where front vowels represented feminine objects or ideas and the back vowels represented masculine objects or ideas. As a result, there were a number of word pairs in the language in which changing the vowels also changed the gender of the word. For example, the difference between the words hehe (woman) and haha (man) or eme (mother) and ama (father) was essentially a contrast between the front vowel, [e], of the feminine and the back vowel, [a], of the masculine counterpart.

== Writing system ==
The Manchu language uses the Manchu script, which was derived from the traditional Mongol script, which in turn was based on the vertically written pre-Islamic Uyghur script. Manchu is now usually romanized according to the transliteration system employed by Jerry Norman in his Comprehensive Manchu-English Dictionary (2013). The Jurchen language, which is ancestral to Manchu, used the Jurchen script, which is derived from the Khitan script, which in turn was derived from Chinese characters. There is no relation between the Jurchen script and the Manchu script.

Chinese characters, employed as phonograms, can also be used to transliterate Manchu. All the Manchu vowels and the syllables commencing with a consonant are represented by single Chinese characters as are also the syllables terminating in i, n, ng and o; but those ending in r, k, s, t, p, I, m are expressed by the union of the sounds of two characters, there being no Mandarin syllables terminating with these consonants. Thus the Manchu syllable am is expressed by the Chinese characters 阿木 a mù, and the word Manchu is, in the Kangxi Dictionary, written as 瑪阿安諸烏 mă ā ān zhū wū.

=== Teaching ===
Mongols learned their script as a syllabary, dividing the syllables into twelve different classes, based on the final phonemes of the syllables, all of which ended in vowels. The Manchus followed the same syllabic method when learning Manchu script, also with syllables divided into twelve different classes based on the final phonemes of the syllables. Today, the opinion on whether it is alphabetic or syllabic in nature is still split between different experts. In China, it is considered syllabic and Manchu is still taught in this manner. The alphabetic approach is used mainly by foreigners who want to learn the language, as studying the Manchu script as a syllabary takes longer.

Despite the alphabetic nature of its script, Manchu was not taught phoneme per letter like western languages are; Manchu children were taught to memorize all the syllables in the Manchu language separately as they learned to write, like Chinese characters. To paraphrase Meadows 1849,

Manchus when learning, instead of saying l, a—la; l, o—lo; &c., were taught at once to say la, lo, &c. Many more syllables than are contained in their syllabary might have been formed with their letters, but they were not accustomed to arrange them otherwise. They made, for instance, no such use of the consonants l, m, n, and r, as westerners do; hence if the Manchu letters s, m, a, r, t, are joined in that order a Manchu would not able to pronounce them as English speaking people pronounce the word 'smart'.

== Morphology ==
While Manchu is a synthetic and agglutinative language typologically similar to the neighbouring Mongolic and Turkic languages, its morphology is nevertheless less complex than theirs and its synthetic character is not so pronounced as theirs.

=== Gender ===
Manchu has no grammatical gender, although the distinction between nouns referring to humans and nouns referring to non-humans does play a certain role in its grammar (as explained below). However, as already mentioned, biological gender is expressed by different vowels in a number of word pairs, where a phonologically back vowel is associated with males and a phonologically front one with females: ama "father" – eme "mother", haha "man" – hehe "woman", naca "brother-in-law" – nece "sister-in-law", hūwašan (Chinese héshang 和尚) "monk" – huwešen "nun", amila "male animal" – emile "female animal", arsalan "lion" – erselen "lioness", garudai "male phoenix" – gerudei "female phoenix"; similarly for words related to genders such as habtaha "man's belt" – hebtehe "woman's belt", ganggan "strong" – genggen "weak".

=== Number ===
Only nouns referring to humans decline for number. The plural number is formed by the addition of several suffixes, depending on the specific noun.

- The suffix -sa/se has broad usage: it is used, inter alia, with many words expressing occupations (faksi "workman" – faksisa "workmen") and nationalities (manju "Manchu" – manjusa "Manchus").
- The suffix -ta/te is mostly limited to words denoting persons of a certain age or generation and relatives (ama "father" – amata "fathers"), although there are a few others such as ejen "lord" – ejete "lords". However, the suffix -sa/se can also be used with nouns with the same types of meaning: gege "elder sister" – gegese "elder sisters".
- The less common suffix -si occurs in a number of nouns mostly with that type of meaning, too, e.g. in haha "man" — hahasi "men".
- Finally, a few words use the suffix -ri: mama "grandmother" – mamari "grandmothers".

Note that the final consonant -n is normally lost before the plural suffixes: ahūn "elder brother" – ahūta "elder brothers"; the final -i is likewise lost in jui "son" – juse "sons".

In addition, plurality can be expressed by the addition of some words meaning "all" or "many", such as geren (geren' niyalma "all/many men/persons"), by the addition of words meaning "kind" or "class" (gurgu jergi "various wild animals", baita'hacin "various affairs"), or by reduplication (jalan "generation, world" – jalan jalan "generations, worlds").

=== Cases ===
Manchu has five cases, which are marked by particles: nominative, accusative, genitive, dative-locative, and ablative. The particles can be written with the noun to which they apply or separately. They do not obey the rule of vowel harmony but are also not truly postpositions.

==== Nominative ====
One of the principal syntactic cases, it is used for the subject of a sentence and has no overt marking.

==== Accusative ====
(be): one of the principal syntactic cases, it indicates participants/direct object of a sentence. It is written separate from the word that it follows.

i boo be weile-mbi
he house ACC build-IMPERF
"He builds a house"

Certain Manchu verbs govern the accusative in spite of the fact that verbs with similar semantics in other languages do not take a direct object:

amba-sa saisa doro be kice-mbi, jemengge be kice-rakū
high.official(amban)-PL gentleman way ACC care.about-IMPERF, food ACC care.about-PART(NEG)
"Wise men care about the way, not about the food"

Direct objects sometimes also take the nominative. It is commonly felt that the marked accusative has a definite sense, like using a definite article in English. However, in the negative form, transitive verbs always take the accusative:

cira be tuwa-hakū
face ACC see-PART(NEG)
"(Someone) did not see the face"

The direct object expressing an object that is caused to perform an action also stands in the accusative:

tere be baita icihiya-bu-me gene
that/he ACC business do-CAUS-CVB go(IMP)
"Go and order him to do business"

The accusative may also indicate the space in which motion is happening or the means by which it is happening, as in jugūn be yabu-me ("going along a road") and morin be yabu-me ("riding a horse").

==== Genitive-Instrumental ====
(i or ni): one of the principal syntactic cases, it is used to indicate possession or the means by which something is accomplished. The allomorph ni is used after words ending in a consonant other than /n/, whereas i is used in all other cases: boo i "of the house", but gurung ni "of the palace".

Its primary function is to indicate the possessor of an entity:

boo i ejen
house GEN master
"the master of the house"

It can also indicate a person's relationships:

han i jui
khan GEN child
"the khan's child"

Sometimes a broader attributive relation (not necessarily a possessive one) is expressed, e.g. doro i yoro "a ceremonial arrow".

Verbs and participles can also be modified by a phrase in the genitive, resulting in adverbial meaning:

niyalma sain mujilen i mimbe tuwa-mbi
people good intention GEN I-ACC look.at-IMPERF
"people look at me with good intention"

Adverbs are regularly formed from nouns by a repetition of the noun followed by a genitive marker: giyan "order", "proper" > giyan giyan i "in proper order".

==== Dative-locative ====
(de): indicates location, time, place, or indirect object.

Its primary function is to indicate the semantic role of the recipient:

ere niyalma de bu-mbi
this man DAT give-IMPERF
"(Someone) gives to this man"

It can also indicate a person who is in possession of something in the construction meaning "A has B", which is expressed literally as "To A (there) is B":

ahun de bithe bi
elder.brother DAT book COP
"The elder brother has a book"

Another function is to indicate the instrument of action, making it play the role of an instrumental case as well:

angga de hūla, mujilen de eje
mouth DAT read(IMP) mind DAT memorize(IMP)
"Use your lips to read and your brain to remember"

However, the genitive can often express the same instrumental meaning. It has been claimed that the genitive is used for the instrument of one's own actions as opposed to those of others (e.g. mini yasa i tuwa-ci "Seeing with my eyes" vs si yasa de tuwa-ki "You see with your eyes") and for non-past actions as opposed to past ones (beye-i gala-i gaisu "take with your own hand" vs beye i gala de jafa-habi "(Someone) caught with his own hand").

A related function is to express the agent of a verb in the passive voice:

julergi gurun joo de wa-bu-fi
senior ruling.house Zhao DAT kill-PASS-CVB
"(They) were killed by the Senior Zhao ruling house"

The dative can also indicate the source of a statement or quotation, meaning roughly "according to", as in mini gūnin de "in my opinion" and ejen i hese de "according to the emperor's edict".

Finally, as already mentioned, it can express location in space or time, thus functioning as a locative case:

alin bujan de tomo-mbi
mountain forest DAT live-IMPERF
“(They) live in mountains and forests.”

=== Ablative ===
(ci): indicates the origin of an action or the basis for a comparison.

That can be the starting point in space or time:

boo-ci tuci-ke
house-ABL go.away-PAST
"(Someone) went away from the house"

It can also be used to compare objects:

ere erin ci oyonggo ningge akū
this time ABL important NMLZ COP.NEG
"There is no time more important than the present"

In Classical Manchu, there was also a case marker deri, which has been said to have more or less the same ablative uses as ci; in Xibe, however, it differs from ci by being specialized for the expression of comparison:

encu hehe-ši {(ma. hehe-si)} deri fulu tua-mbi {(ma. tuwa-mbi)}
other woman-PL {} from better consider-IMPERF {}
"(He) began to consider her better than other women"

=== Pronouns ===
Manchu personal pronouns have a clusivity distinction and mostly use the same case markers as nouns, but with some stem changes.

Manchu Pronoun Cases
	1st person			2nd person		3rd person	
	singular	plural		singular	plural	singular	plural
	singular	exclusive	inclusive	singular	plural	singular	plural
Nominative	bi	be	muse	si	suwe	i	ce
Accusative	mimbe	membe	musebe	simbe	suwembe	imbe	cembe
Genitive	mini	meni	musei	sini	suweni	ini	ceni
Dative	minde	mende	musede	sinde	suwende	inde	cende
Ablative	minci	menci	museci	sinci	suwenci	inci	cenci

The 3rd person pronouns are used with human referents, but do not refer to non-humans. With non-humans, the demonstrative pronouns ere "this" and tere "that" are used instead. Possession can be expressed with the genitive form of the personal pronouns: mini boo "my house", sini boo „your (sing.) house", musei boo "our house" etc. Like English, Manchu has special forms for substantively used possessive pronouns; these are formed with the suffix -ngge: miningge "mine", gūwaingge "somebody else's".

ere uthai we-i jaka – miningge
this then who-GEN thing – mine
"Whose is this thing? – It's mine."

As in other East Asian languages, educated Manchus in the imperial period tended to avoid personal pronouns, especially for the first and second person, and often used paraphrases instead. For example, Manchu officials, when talking to the Emperor, referred to themselves with the word aha "slave" (instead of the pronoun bi "I"), and Han Chinese ones used amban "subject". The Emperor, when talking to Manchu princes (amban and beile), called himself sitahūn niyalma "wretched person" or emteli beye "orphan". In general, calques from Chinese were used. Another alternative were combinations of the personal pronouns in genitive and the word beye "self": mini beye "I" (lit. "my self"), sini beye "you (polite)" (lit. "your self").

The demonstrative pronouns are formed with the stems e- and u- for proximal (close) entities and te- and tu- for distal (far) entitites: ere "this", enteke "such", ubaingge "local (from here)"; tere "that", tenteke "such", tubaingge "local (from there)".

The demonstrative pronouns ere "this" and tere "that" can also be used alone like personal pronouns (and are obligatorily so for non-human referents). They form the plural with -se and are declined in a way that is not always entirely regular:

—	this one	that one	these (ones)	those (ones)
Nominative	ere	tere	ese	tese
Genitive	ere(n)i	terei	esei	tesei
Dative	e(re)de	te(re)de	esede	tesede
Accusative	erebe	terebe	esebe	tesebe
Ablative	ereci	tereci	eseci	teseci

When pronouns function as attributes, the case marker is not placed after the pronoun, but only after the noun:

enenggi ere ba de ainu ebu-mbi
today this place DAT why stop-IMPERF
"Why have you stopped here today?"

The most important interrogative pronouns are we "who", ai "what", ya "what, which" (attributive), aika, aimaka, yaka, yamaka "what sort of", aba, aiba, yaba "where", eke "who is this?", udu "how much/many?", ainu "how, why?". The following table exemplifies the case declension of interrogative pronouns:

Nominative	we "who?"	ai "what?"	ya "what, which?"
Genitive	wei "whose?"	aini "with/by what?"	–
Dative	wede "to whom?"	aide "where, why, how?"	ya de "where?"
Accusative	webe "whom?"	aibe "what?"	ya be "what, which?"
Ablative	weci "from whom?"	aici "what sort of ...?"	yaci "from where?"

The pronouns ai, ya and we are also used as relative pronouns.

The most important indefinite pronouns are we we "whoever"; ai ai, ya ya "whatever", aika, aimaka, yaka, yamaka "whatever, whichever (attributive)"; ememu, ememungge "many", gūwa "someone (else)"; eiten, yaya, beri beri, meni meni, meimeni, geren "every", "all".

=== Adjectives ===
Adjectives in Manchu are not very distinct from nouns as regards their grammatical properties, so many scholars have argued that they are not a separate part of speech; it has been claimed that they are simply a special type of nouns with semantics of quality.

An adjective as an attribute stands without case suffixes in front of the noun.

sain niyalma
good person
"a good person"

As a predicate it stands at the end of the clause.

niyalma sain
person good
"The person is good."

The adjective itself does not have comparison as an inflectional category; instead, comparisons are formed just by inflecting the compared noun in the ablative.

morin indahūn ci amba
horse dog ABL big
"The horse is bigger than the dog."

=== Final particles ===
Final particles can be used as copulas. The most important final particles are kai (confirming), be (defining), akū (negating, "there is not"), waka (negating, "is not"), dere (suppositional, "probably"), inu (also as an adverb: affirmative); dabala (restricting, "only"), semeo (admirative or dubitative), unde (also a conjunction; "not yet"); jiya/jiye (exalamatory), bai (with imperative; "just"), na/ne/no, ya (interrogative, also exclamatory). Of the interrogative particles, na is placed after nouns as well as verbs, whereas o is placed after verbs only (both in yes/no-questions), and ni is placed in the end of the sentence (and occurs also in WH-questions): e.g. boo de gemu sain-na "Is everything well at home?", ere ai bi-he ni "What is this?", gasha be eigen gai-ci o-mbi-o? "May I take a bird as a husband?", lit. "If taking a bird as a husband, does it become?"

=== Verbs ===
The Manchu verb has no number and person agreement. The pure verb stem functions as the imperative of the second person, singular and plural; otherwise the verb takes participial, converbal and verbal suffixes, which also express mood and aspect. It has been argued that the aspect contrast to some extent has acquired the function of a tense contrast as well, because the perfect and imperfect participles have partly developed a secondary meaning of past and present-future tense, respectively.

There are 13 basic verb forms, some of which can be further modified with the verb bi (is), or the particles akū, i, o, and ni (negative, instrumental, and interrogatives).

Conjugation of the verb afa- (to attack)
Form	Usual Suffix	Example
imperfective finite form	-mbi	afambi
imperative	-∅	afa
imperfect participle	-ra/re/ro	afara
perfect participle	-ha/he/ho	afaha
imperfect converb	-me	afame
perfect converb	-fi	afafi
conditional converb	-ci	afaci
concessive converb	-cibe	afacibe
terminal converb	-tala/tele/tolo	afatala
prefatory converb	-nggala/nggele/nggolo	afanggala
optative-desiderative	-ki	afaki
optative-desiderative-imperative	-kini	afakini
optative-imperative	-cina	afacina
apprehensive converb	-rahū	afarahū
past indefinite	-habi/-hebi/-hobi	afahabi
past perfect	-ha/-he/-ho (-ka/-ke/-ko) + bihe	afaha bihe
past continuous	-mbihe	afambihe
far past	–mbihebi	afambihebi
Passive/causative	-bu-/-mbu-	afabu-
directional suffixes	-nji- & -na-/-ne-/-no-	afanji- & afana-
Associative suffixes	-nu- & -ca-/-ce-/-co	afanu- & afaca-
reciprocal suffix	-ndu-	afandu-
productive suffixes	-la/-le/-lo, -ra/-re/-ro, etc	
durative suffixes	–ša/-še/-šo, –ja/-je/-jo, -ta/-te	
decausative suffix	–ja/-je/-jo	
deputative suffix	–nggi	
substantive suffix	–ngge	afangge
durative converb	–hai/-hei/-hoi	afahai
simultaneous converb	–mbime	afambime
alternative converb	–ralame/-relame/-rolame	afaralame
instrumental converb	–tai/-tei-/toi	afarai

==== Participles ====
Participles play an important role in Manchu grammar, because most finite forms are derived from them. They can have four different functions in the sentence:

1. They can be used attributively.
2. They can receive nominalizing suffixes – among them case markers – and in that form, they can function like nouns as subject, object, etc.
3. They can function as the head of the predicate in the equivalent of a dependent clause.
4. They can function as the head of the predicate of a sentence, even without a copula.

==== Imperfect participle ====
The imperfect participle is formed by adding the variable suffix -ra, -re, -ro to the stem of the verb. Ra occurs when the final syllable of the stem contains an a. Re occurs when the final syllable of the stem contains e, i, u or ū. Ro occurs with stems containing all o's. An irregular suffix -dara, -dere, -doro is added to a limited group of irregular verbs (jon-, wen-, ban-) with a final -n. (The perfect participle of these verbs is also irregular). Three of the most common verbs in Manchu also have irregular forms for the imperfect participle:

- bi-, bisire — 'be'
- o-, ojoro — 'become'
- je-, jetere — 'eat'

Imperfect participles can be used as objects, attributes, and predicates. Using ume alongside the imperfect participle makes a negative imperative.

As an attribute:

habša-ra niyalma
complain-IPTC man
"A man who complains"

When this form is used predicatively it is usually translated as a future tense in English; it often carries an indefinite or conditional overtone when used in this fashion:

bi sinde ala-ra
1sg 2sg-ACC tell-IPTC
"I'll tell you"

As an object:

gisure-re be han donji-fi
speak-IPTC ACC king hear-PCVB
"The king having heard what was being said"

===== Perfect participle =====
The perfect participle in -ha/-he/-ho often expresses an action in the past tense: e.g. araha, while originally meaning "who has written", can also be used in the sense "(I, you, etc.) wrote". Certain verbs take, instead of -ha/-he/-ho, the ending -ka/-ke/-ko, fewer still take -nka/-nke/-nko, and a few have irregular forms: bahambi "find" – baha, hafumbi "penetrate" – hafuka.

===== Relative/indefinite participle =====
When the indefinite pronoun ele "all" is added to a perfective or imperfective participle, the resulting form has a relative/indefinite meaning: bisire ele jaka "whatever things are present", mini alaha ele ba "whatever I said", "everything I said". The pronoun can also merge into the preceding word as a suffix -le: arahale, ararale „whoever writes", "whatever is written", duleke ele ba "whatever places he passed by", "all places he passed by". This suffix did not exhibit vowel-harmony alternations in older Manchu, but it later acquired the back variant -la.

===== Durative participle =====
The durative participle in -mbihe appears to originate from the imperfect converb in -me and the perfect participle bihe of the verb bi- "to be": thus, almost literally, "(which) was doing (something)". It expresses an incomplete or continuing action in the past: arambihe "(I was) writing".

mahala boo-de weile-mbihe
Hat house-DAT make-PTC.DUR
"They were making hats at home."

===== Nominalization =====
Both participles and verbs in the perfect or imperfect form can be nominalized with the suffix -ngge. These nominalized forms can express either the abstract notion of an action, the object of an action or the subject of an action: arahangge, ararangge "writing", "something written", "someone writing".

Negated forms can be nominalized like this as well: akdarakūngge "distrust", "one who does not trust".

Direct speech and quotes are often introduced with nominalized forms like alarangge "tell, narrate", hendurengge "speak", serengge "say", fonjirengge "ask" or wesimburengge "relate, report", for example:

yuan fai i sargan jui hendu-re-nge tere ahūn deo nadan niyalma gemu hūsun amba niyalma
Yuan Fai GEN female child speak-IMPERF.PTCP-NOMI that elder.brother younger.brother seven man all power big man
"This is what Yuan Fai’s daughter says: all those seven brothers are powerful and big men;"

Participles can also be nominalized with ba "place, circumstance, thing": e.g. sere ba "what is said", "speech", afabu ha ba bi "there is an order" (lit."A thing which has been ordered exists").

==== Converbs ====
Converbs (sometimes referred to as gerunds) have an adverbial function, and constructions with them often correspond to subordinate clauses in English.

===== Imperfect converb =====
The imperfect converb in -me expresses an action that is simultaneous with that of the finite verb, but it may also denote secondary meanings such as manner, condition, cause and purpose, and it can often be translated with an infinitive in English. This is the most frequent type of converb: arame "(while) writing", hendume "(while) saying", fonjime "(while) asking", necihiyeme toktobumbi "conquer", lit. "stabilise, (while) levelling" (a calque of Chinese píng-dìng 平定).

amba edun da-me deribu-he
high wind blow-IMPERF.CVB begin-PTCP
"A strong wind began to blow."

morin be dali-me boo-de ji-he
horse accusative hide-IMPERF.CVB House-DAT come-PERF.PTCP
"He went home to hide the horses."

===== Durative converb =====
The imperfect converb ending -me can be added not only to the stem, but also to the finite imperfect form in -mbi (which, in turn, is originally also a combination of an imperfect converb and the copula verb bi "is", see below). The resulting form ending in -mbime has been described as a separate durative converb, which expresses a non-completed or continuing action. An example is arambime (< ara-me bi-me) "while writing". This form is also used in the following quote by Confucius:

fuzi hendu-me. taci-mbime gūni-r-akū oci, mekele o-mbi. gūni-mbime taci-r-akū oci, jecuhuri o-mbi
master say-IMPERF.CVB. study-DUR.CVB think-IMPERF.PTCP-NEG TOP useless be-IMPERF.IND. think-DUR.CVB study-IMPERF.PTCP-NEG TOP, dangerous be-IMPERF.IND.
The Master said: Studying without thinking is useless. Thinking without studying is dangerous.

===== Perfect converb =====
The perfect converb in -fi expresses an action that took place before the action of the finite verb; a secondary meaning is one of cause. It is the second most frequent converb: arafi "(after) having written", "after I wrote", or, more idiomatically, "I wrote and ...".

si boo-de isina-fi majige teye-fi buda je-fi dere obo-fi jai ji-ki
you House-DAT arrive-PERF.CVB a.little rest-PERF.CVB food eat-PERF.CVB, face wash-PERF.CVB then come-OPT
"After you have come home, rested a little, eaten and washed your face, come (to me)."

A frozen form is ofi "because, since" (from ombi "be", "become"):

si tobsere niyalma o-fi
you trustworthy person be-PERF.CVB
"Since you are a trustworthy person, ..."

Certain verbs have irregular forms: juwambi "open" – juwampi, colgorombi "exceed" – colgoropi, hafumbi "penetrate" – hafupi.

A similar meaning is expressed by adding the ending not to the stem, but to the finite imperfect form in -mbi, resulting in -mbifi: arambifi "having written".

===== Conditional converb =====
The conditional converb in -ci can express a condition, but also the time when something happened: araci "if, when you write"; si niyalma de nikeneci "if you rely on people"; yamun de tucifi tuwaci "as/when he went out to the hall and checked,...".

Frozen forms are oci and seci "if" (from ombi "be" and sembi "say"). They can also serve as topic markers.

===== Concessive/adversative converb =====
The concessive or adversative converb in -cibe forms a construction that can be translated as "even if" or "although": aracibe "even if I write". It appears to be derived from the conditional.

===== Terminative converb =====
The terminative converb in -tala/-tele/-tolo can be translated with clauses introduced by "until"; it expresses a subordinate action that is taking place simultaneously with that of the finite verb, and the latter continues until the first one is finished. hūsun moho-tolo "until his power is exhausted".

In Classical Manchu this form is no longer very productive. The most frequent forms are isitala "until" (from isimbi "reach") and otolo "until" (from ombi "be", "become"):

julge-ci te de isitala
ancient.times-ABL now DAT until
"from ancient times until the present"

===== Descriptive converb =====
The converb with the suffixes -hai/-hei/-hoi or -kai/-kei/-koi, also -tai/-tei/-toi, expresses durative, periodic, frequent or intensive actions or processes: alahai "telling many times", jonkoi "constantly reminding". It appears to be derived from the perfect participle in -ha/he/ho (also -ka/ke/ko in some verbs) and the genitive ending -i in its adverbial function. Such forms have sometimes turned into adverbs: cohotoi "especially" from cohombi "to do especially, regard as the most important aspect". Other examples of this use are the phrases beye be waliyatai "selflessly", lit. "constantly throwing oneself around", and bucetei afambi "to fight to the death", lit. "to fight, constantly dying".

===== Converb in -nggala/-nggele/-nggolo =====
The converb in -nggala/-nggele/-nggolo can be translated with the conjunction "before"; it expresses a subordinate action that has not yet taken place at the time of the main one and will only take place after it: aranggala "before writing"; dosinggala asuki isibumbi "before entering, one makes a noise". A frozen form is onggolo "before".

==== Finite forms ====
The Manchu finite verbal forms are set apart from others by the fact that they can function only as heads of the predicate in an independent clause. (As already mentioned, some participles can have the same function, but they are not limited to it.) All Manchu indicative verbal forms seem to be derived from non-finite ones such as participles and converbs.

===== Imperfect indicative =====
The imperfect is formed with the suffix -mbi, which is derived from the imperfect converb ending -me and the copula verb -bi "to be". This is the dictionary form of the verb. The meaning of the form is of present or future tense. It can express usual, frequent, generic actions, concrete actions in the present, or actions in the future:

indahūn dobori tuwahiya-mbi coko erde hūla-mbi
dog night keep.guard-IMPERF chicken early.in.the.morning sing-IMPERF
"A dog keeps guard at night, a rooster crows early in the morning."

bi hergen be ara-mbi
I character ACC write-IMPERF
"I am writing characters."

si aibi-de gene-mbi
you where-DAT go-IMPERF
"Where are you going?"

i inenggi ji-mbi-o jide-rakū-n
he day come-IMPERF-INTERR come-PTCP.NEG-INTERR
"Will he come today or not?"

===== Perfect indicative =====
The perfect indicative form in -habi/-hebi/-hobi is derived from the perfect participle in -ha/-he/-ho and the copula verb -bi "to be". It expresses an action in the past: arahabi "I wrote, I have written."

nimanggi i elden de bithe hūla-habi
snow GEN light DAT book read-PERF
"One read books by the light (reflected) in snow."

The second part of the suffix, originating from the copula verb bi-, can also be replaced by kai: alahabi, alaha kai "narrated".

===== Frequentative indicative =====
The form in -mbihebi is derived from the durative participle and the verb bi- "to be". It expresses usual and frequent actions in the distant past:

hūwangheo beye nimala fata-mbihebi
Empress self mulberry.tree pick-FREQ
"The Empresses themselves used to pick berries from the mulberry tree"

==== Imperative ====
The pure stem forms the imperative: ala "Report!", te "Sit down!", wa "Kill!"

There is also a stronger form of command in -kini, which is directed at a person of lower rank and which is used also as an optative or impersonal imperative of the third person: arakini "Let him write!", okini "Let it be so!", alakini "Let it be reported!", "Let him report!", genekini "Let him go!". It may be used to command another person to cause a third person to do something.

Another, milder form of command is formed with the ending -cina or -kina, which is used in a concessive sense as well: amasi bucina "Come on / please, give it back!"; alacina, alakina "Speak (if you want to)" or "Please speak!"; aracina "Let him write (if he wants to)". It appears to be derived from the optative form (on which see below) and the interrogative particle -na.

A prohibitative form (corresponding to Chinese mò 莫) is constructed from the imperfect converb preceded by ume : ume genere "Don't go!", ume fonjire "Don't ask!"

Certain verbs have irregular imperative forms: baimbi "seek", "request" – baisu; bimbi "be present", "remain" – bisu; jembi "eat" – jefu; -njimbi "come in order to ..." – -nju; ombi "be, become" – oso.

==== Optative ====
The optative in -ki expresses an action that the speaker wishes or intends to see performed – either by themselves or by others. Its meaning is sometimes akin to that of Chinese yào 要. Thus bi geneki means "I will go", whereas i geneki means "Let him go". Other examples are araki "I will/want to write", alaki "I will/want to say", bi manju gisun be taciki "I will/want to learn Manchu", fa hūbalaki "I will paper over the windows", teki "please, sit down". When the optative refers to the second or third person, its meaning is close to that of an imperative. When it refers to an action that has not yet taken place, it also has the additional meaning of future.

=== Negation ===
According to Gorelova, neither the finite verb forms nor the converbs have special negative forms; only the participle does. If a verb or converb need to be negated, a participle must be used instead of them. The participle is negated by a combination with the word akū "not be (here)": thus, literally, "I am-not doing-X". Still, Möllendorff (1892) does give an example of the negation of an indicative form with akū "not (be)": bi gisurembi akū "I don't speak". The particle may be translated with the Chinese particles wú 無, bù 不, wèi 未, méiyǒu 沒有.

==== Negation with akū ====
The word akū "is not" is the most universal negator in Manchu. It is a negative copula: mangga akū "it is not difficult". It can negate existence: etuku akū "there is no clothing." It may also negate attributes, as in dutu akū "not deaf", and it may express the meaning "without": gūnin akū niyalma, lit. "a person without brains", i.e. "a stupid person".

The participle suffixes -ra/-re/-ro merge with akū into -rakū, -ha/-ho into -hakū and -he into -hekū: arahaku "not have written", genehekū, genehakū "not have gone"; ararakū "not (be going to) write", generakū "not (be going to) go".

Accordingly, the negated forms of perfect indicative -habi/-hebi/-hobi, which contain the perfect participle in -ha/he/ho, end in -hakūbi/-hekūbi. There are certain irregular forms: sambi "know" – sarkū "don't know", dabahakū "has not exceeded", jihekū "has not come".

The negated participles are often followed by converb forms of the auxiliary verbs bimbi "be", ombi "become" or sembi "say":

te gaija-r-akū o-ci gūwa gai-ka de sini dolo ume ehe gūni-he
now take-PTCP.IMPERF-NEG become-CVB.COND other take-PTCP.PERF DAT you.GEN inside PTCL.PROH bad think-PTCP.PERF
"If you don't take it now and somebody else does, don't hold it against him!“

The negated form of the conditional converb here is the construction gaijirakū oci ("if ... doesn't take").

The suffixes -ci, -fi and -ngge are placed after -akū : ararakūci "if he doesn't write", ararakūfi "doesn't write and", "not having written", ararakūngge "the one who does not write", bisirakūngge "those who aren't here" (Chinese bù zài de 不在的).

The word akū alone can take other suffixes, too: bi akūmbi "I am not". A double negation in -akūngge akū (Chinese wú bù 無不) is also possible: serakūngge akū "nothing unsaid", "he says everything".

The word umai, which seems to consist of the prohibitative particle ume and the pronoun ai "what", may be used before akū and seems to enhance its negative sense, as seen in the example umai niyalma akū "no persons (at all) are there".

==== Negation with waka ====
The particle waka is used predominantly as a negative copula. Examples are bi waka aniya kai "I am not (at fault), it is the (bad) year", inu ja baita waka "this is not a simple matter".

==== Negation with unde ====
The word unde "not yet" is placed after the imperfect participle in -ra/-re/-ro at the end of the clause: jidere unde "(he) has not come yet", bi sabure unde "I have not seen it yet".

==== Apprehension ====
The imperfect participle can be combined with -hū to produce a form that expresses apprehension/fear (participium metuendi; cf. Mongolian -ujai): jiderahū "If only he doesn't come".

ama eme damu nime-rahū se-me jobo-mbi
father mother only ill-PTCP(NEG) say-CVB.IMPERF worry-IMPERF
"My only worry is that father and mother might get ill."

Gorelova believes that this form is originally identical to the negation of the imperfect participle in -ra-(a)kū.

=== Interrogative forms ===
Interrogative forms are derived from declarative ones by the edition of further suffixes. The particle -o can be added to a verbal form in order to convert a statements into a yes/no-question. It is added to the copula bi-, the imperfect indicative in -mbi (which also ends in -bi) and to the imperfect and perfect participles in -ra/re-/ro and -ha/he/ho, forming respectively the sequences -bio, -mbio, -rao/-reo/-roo, -hao/-heo/-hoo. In these sequences, -o is pronounced /u/. Some examples are: Minde bureo? "Will you give it to me?"; Si terebe tuwahao? Tuwaha. "Have you seen him? – Yes." Si cai omihao? "Have you drunk tea?" The particle -o can also be added to the negative particle waka: Manju bithe hūlambi wakao? "Are you not studying the Manchu language?" (lit. "Are you not reading Manchu books?").

The imperfect interrogative form in -rao/-reo/-roo can also be used as an imperative to older or socially superior persons: tereo? "Please sit down!", lit. "Will (you) sit down?"

The universal interrogative particle is -ni. It can be added to verb forms to produce yes/no-questions in the same way as -o; after negatives, however, it is reduced to -n: si sabu-rakū-n? "Have you not seen?", suwe sambio sarkūn "Do you know this or do you not know it?", si sembi akūn? "Do you eat it or not?" In addition, the words sain "good", "well" and yargiyan "true, real, truth, reality" had the special interrogative forms saiyūn and yargiyūn: si saiyūn? "How are you?", yargiyūn? "Is it true?"

Furthermore, it can be used in wh-questions and be added to nouns and adjectives as well (ere ai turgun ni "What is the reason for this?"). It generally stands at the end of a sentence: ainu urunakū aisi be hendumbini "Why do we necessarily have to talk about profits?"

The combination nio can be added to negations to form rhetorical questions: ere sain akū nio "is that not beautiful?"

=== Auxiliary verbs ===
Composite verb forms are constructed with the auxiliary verbs bimbi, bi "be, exist, remain", ombi "be/become (such), be possible", sembi "say, tell, consider", acambi "be suitable", mutembi "be able to" and hamimbi "approach, be near".

==== bimbi "to be" ====
- Indefinite future – imperfect participle with optative: genere biki "I will go", "I will be there".
- Definite perfect – Perfect participle with bi: wajiha bi "is finished" (note that this same construction is the origin of the indicative perfect).
- Past perfect – the perfect participle in -ha/-he/-ho forms together with the past form of the copula, bihe, a past perfect tense: araha bihe "I had written", tere bade tehe bihe "he had sat down there", tuwaha bihe "he had seen it"
- Durative past perfect – perfect participle with bihebi.
- Hypothesis – perfect participle with bici or with bihe bici: arahabici "if I had written", ehe niyalma de hajilaha bici "If you had become involved with bad people".
- Preterite – The imperfect converb with bihe expresses a continuous action that has come to an end: alame bihe "he used to say".
- Imperative –The synthetic forms of the imperative can be replaced with analytical forms consisting of a converb and bisu (the imperative of bimbi): ala – alame bisu.

==== ombi "to be, become" ====
- Imperative – The synthetical forms of the imperative can be replaced with analytical forms consisting of a converb and oso, the imperative of ombi: ala – alame oso.

==== sembi "to say" ====
- Imperative – The synthetical forms of the imperative can be replaced with analytical forms consisting of a converb and sereo: alarao – alame sereo.

=== Voice ===
==== Passive and causative ====
Voice is a somewhat problematic and controversial category in Manchu. The form for passive voice in Manchu is generally formed with the suffix -bu :

baita de uša-bu-ha
matter DAT charge-PASS-PTCP.PERF
"(someone) was charged with the matter."

In certain verbs, the passive is formed with the suffix -mbu instead, although it has also been claimed to have a different shade of meaning.

Many verbs in the passive voice have a reflexive meaning:

gurun dasa-bu-mbi
state correct-PASS-PTCP.PERF
"The state is improving."

Surprisingly, the suffix -bu (or, in many cases, -mbu) also expresses the causative: this, arambumbi means "be written", but also "make (someone) write".

tere-be gene-bu!
this-ACC go-CAUS(IMP)
"Order him to go!"

The combination of both suffixes -mbu and -bu is also possible in order to form a passive causative construction: arambubumbi "have (something) written", lit. "make (something) be written".

==== Reciprocal ====
The reciprocal voice is formed with -ndu: aisilambi "help" – aisilandumbi "help each other".

==== Associative ====
The associative voice is formed with -ca/-ce/-co or with -nu: ilimbi "stand" – ilicambi "to stand together in a group", afambi "fight" – afanumbi "fight together with others".

=== Aspect: durative, frequentative and intensive ===
The durative aspect can be expressed by the suffixes -ta/-te/-to, -nja/-nje/-njo or -ša/-še/-šo, the iterative by -ta/-te and the frequentative or intensive by -ca/-ce/-co: jailambi "evade" – jailatambi "evade everywhere", injembi "laugh" – injecembi "laugh persistently in the crowd", halambi "change" – halanjambi "alternate", ibembi "go forward" – ibešembi "go forward step by step".

=== Direction: ventive, andative and missive ===
In verbs of locomotion in the broadest sense there is a distinction between movement away from the speaker (andative) and towards the speaker (ventive). This is similar to the complement of direction in Chinese (andative qù 去 "go" vs ventive lái 來 "come"). The andative is expressed by the suffix -na/-ne/-no (possibly connected to genembi "go") and the ventive is expressed by -nji (possibly connected to jimbi "come"). Besides, a missive form is constructed with the suffix -nggi (possibly connected to unggimbi "send"): alambi "report" – alanambi "go in order to report", alanjimbi "come with a report", alanggimbi "send with a report", fekumbi "jump" – fekunembi "jump over there" – fekunjembi "jump over here", ebišembi "bathe" – ebišenembi "go bathe".

== Syntax ==
All Manchu phrases are head-final; the head-word of a phrase (e.g. the noun of a noun phrase, or the verb of a verb phrase) always falls at the end of the phrase. Thus, adjectives and adjectival phrases always precede the noun they modify, and the arguments to the verb always precede the verb. As a result, Manchu sentence structure is subject–object–verb (SOV).

Manchu uses a small number of case-marking particles that are similar to those found in Korean, but there is also a separate class of true postpositions. Case markers and postpositions can be used together, as in the following sentence:

bi tere niyalma-i emgi gene-he
I that person-GEN with go-PST
I went with that person

In this example, the postposition emgi, "with", requires its nominal argument to have the genitive case, which causes the genitive case marker i between the noun niyalma and the postposition.

Manchu also makes extensive use of converb structures and has an inventory of converbial suffixes to indicate the relationship between the subordinate verb and the finite verb that follows it. An example is these two sentences, which have finite verbs:

tere sargan boo ci tuci-ke
that woman house ABL {go out}-PST.FIN
That woman came out of the house.

tere sargan hoton de gene-he
that woman town DAT go-PST.FIN
That woman went to town.

Both sentences can be combined into a single sentence by using converbs, which relate the first action to the second:

tere sargan boo ci tuci-fi, hoton de gene-he
that woman house ABL {go out}-PST.CVB, town DAT go-PST.FIN
That woman, having come out of the house, went to town.

tere sargan boo ci tuci-me, hoton de gene-he
that woman house ABL {go out}-IMPERF.CVB, town DAT go-PST.FIN
That woman, coming out of the house, went to town.

tere sargan boo ci tuci-cibe, hoton de gene-he
that woman house ABL {go out}-CONC.CVB, town DAT go-PST.FIN
That woman, though she came out of the house, went to town.

== Word formation ==
=== Word formation ===
Manchu has numerous productive derivational suffixes.

==== Nouns ====
Abstract nouns are derived from verbs with the suffixes:

- -n, e.g. acan "meeting" from aca- "meet",
- -gan/gen/gon / -han/hen/hon, e.g. nirugan "a picture" from niru- "to draw".
- -cun. e.g. akacun "grief" from aka- "grieve".

Nouns denoting instruments are derived from verbs with the suffixes:

- -ku/kū, e.g. anjikū "hatchet" from anji- "to hack". When derived from a verb stem that ends in the passive/causative suffix -bu-, the meaning is often of an agent noun: tacibukū "teacher" from tacibu- "to teach" from taci- "to learn".
- -sun and -fun, e.g. ijifun "comb" from iji- "to comb", umiyesun "girdle" from umiye- "to gird oneself"
- -tun, e.g. alitun "cup", "offering table" from ali- "receive, hold up"

Agent nouns are derived both from verb and from noun stems with the suffixes -si, -msi, -ci, -ji, -lji, -mji, -nju: kimcisi "investigator" from kimci- "to investigate", bithesi "scribe" from bithe "book". A more peculiar meaning of an obtained object is expressed by the suffix -ci in some words like ihaci "cowhide" from ihan "bovine".

Adjectives or nouns denoting the possessor of a quality are derived both from verb and from noun stems; when the word is derived from a verb. the meaning is sometimes of an agent noun. The following suffixes are used:

- -tu/du, e.g. bekitu "strong man" from beki- "strong", songgotu "crybaby" from songgo- "cry", girutu "ashamed" from giru "to be ashamed"
- -ta/da/to/do, e.g. giohoto "beggar" from gioho- "to beg", sanggata "having holes" from sangga "hole"
- -ki, e.g. acabuki "flatterer" from acabu- "to flatter", ambaki "arrogant" from amba "big".

The diminutive suffixes are -kan/ken/kon, -gan/gen and -cen : e.g. bira "river" – biragan "small river", golmin "long" – golmikan "somewhat/rather long".

The augmentative suffix is -linggū/linggu: e.g. amban "big" – ambalinggū "huge", ehe "bad" – ehelinggu "very bad".

==== Verbs ====
A number of suffixes derive verbs, mostly from nouns.

- The suffix -la/-le/-lo forms a verb, in which the base noun is the object of the activity: songko "a trace" – songkolo- "to follow a trace"; aba "a hunt" – abala- "to hunt".
- The suffix -ra/-re/-ro is used in a similar way: gisun "word" – gisure- "to speak", monggo "Mongolia" – monggoro- "to speak Mongolian", "to behave like a Mongol".
- The suffix -na/-ne/-no forms in part a type of inchoative verb or expresses an inherent development or capability of an object or a person: fiyeren "fissure" – fierene- "to split", ilha "flower" – ilhana- "to bloom"; .
- The suffix -ša/-še/-šo forms verbs that express the effort to achieve a certain result: sain "good" – saiša- "praise", oncohon "arrogant" – oncohošo- "to boast", buleku "mirror" – bulekuše- "to look at oneself in a mirror".
- The suffix -da/-de/-do forms verbs with intensive or durative meaning or the gradual development of an action: jili "anger" – jilida- "get angry", ceku "a swing" – cekude- "to swing", eruwen "a drill" – eruwede- "to drill", goho "elegant" – gohodo- "to dress up".
- The suffix -ja/-je/-jo also has intensive or durative meaning: gūninja- "to think over carefully" from gūnin "thought".

Other suffixes of this type are -ta/te/to (gosita- "to love" from gosin "love") -tu, -li, and -mi.

Verbs are derived from other verbs, sometimes with intensive and causative meaning, with the suffixes -niye and -kiya/kiye, -giya/giye, -hiya/hiye: e.g. ebeniye- "to wet thoroughly" from ebe- "to wet", jalukiya- "to fill" from jalu- "to be full, filled", tuwakiya- "to guard" from tuwa- "to watch".

On the formation of verbs with a certain aspect, voice or direction, see the grammar section.

== Vocabulary ==
=== Loanwords ===
Apart from the inherited Tungusic vocabulary, Manchu contains loanwords above all from Mongolian and from Chinese. There are also many loanwords of Turkic origin; these probably entered it via Mongolian as well. It has been estimated that twenty to thirty percent of the Manchu vocabulary consists of Mongolian loanwords.

=== Numerals ===
The numerals are as follows:

1 emu	11 juwan emu		
2 juwe	12 juwan juwe	20 orin⁑	200 juwe tanggū
3 ilan	13 juwan ilan	30 gūsin⁂	300 ilan tanggū
4 duin	14 juwan duin	40 dehi	etc.
5 sunja	15 tofohon*	50 susai	
6 ninggun	16 juwan ninggun	60 ninju	
7 nadan	etc.	70 nadanju	
8 jakūn		80 jakūnju	
9 uyun		90 uyunju	
10 juwan		100 tanggū	

21 orin emu etc.

101 tanggū emu etc.

1000 minggan (from Mongolian ‹mingɣ-a(n)›)

10000 tumen (from Mongolian ‹tüme(n)›)

100000 juwan tumen

1000000 tanggū tumen

* irregular; cf. Mongolian ‹tabu(n)› "five"

⁑ cf. Mongolian ‹qori(n)›

⁂ cf. Mongolian ‹ɣuči(n)›

For higher numbers, loanwords from Sanskrit are also used, above all in the translation of Buddhist texts.

Most ordinal numerals are formed with the suffix -ci, before which stem-final -n is elided (except in juwanci "tenth" and tumenci "tenthousandth"). Distributive numerals are formed with the suffix -ta/-te/-to; again, stem-final -n is elided: emte "one each", juwete "two each", ilata "three each" etc. Fractions are formed according to the following pattern:

ilan (ubu) ci emu
three (part) ABL one
"one-third" (literally: "of three parts one")

sunja (ubu) ci ilan
five (part) ABL three
"three fifths"

The word ubu "part" can be in the genitive case as well:

ninggun ubu-i sunja
six part-GEN five
"five sixths"

This is the same construction as in Chinese:

sān fēn zhī èr
三 分 之 二
three part GEN two
"two thirds"

Multiplicatives are formed with the suffix -rsu or with a following ubu "part":

emursu, emu ubu "single"; jursu, juwe ubu "double"; ilarsu, ilan ubu "threefold"; etc.

Collectives are formed with the suffix -nofi: juwenofi "two together", ilanofi "three together", duinofi "four together" etc.

Iterative numerals are formed mostly with the suffix -nggeri or -geri:

emgeri "once", juwenggeri "twice", ilanggeri "thrice", duinggeri "fourth" etc.

For dates, Manchu uses a system similar to Chinese, combining a cycle of ten (juwan cikten "the ten colours" or "stems") and cycle of twelve (juwan juwe gargan "the twelve animals" or "branches").

=== Classifiers ===
In Manchu there is, as in Chinese, a significant number of classifiers (also called measure words), which stand between the numeral and the noun:

ilan fesin loho
three CL sword
"three swords"

The classifier fesin "handle" is used for objects with a handle or a hilt such as knives, swords, sabres, spades, fans etc.(similarly to the Chinese classifier bǎ 把).

Further examples of classifiers are afaha "sheet" for paper, lists etc. (cf. Chinese zhāng 張), debtelin "volume" for books (cf. Chinese běn 本), angga "mouth" for animals, objects with openings (pots, bags etc.), ports, mountain passes etc., baksan "bundle" for "Bundles" for sheaves of grain, bundles of paper, bunches of keys, caravans, etc., dalgan "surface" for flat objects such as flags, mirrors, fans and meat cutlets etc.

=== Postpositions ===
Some postpositions, such as baru "to", are not derived from other words, while others are originally declined forms of other parts of speech, such as nouns in a certain case (e.g. dade "in addition to", lit. "in the base of") and converbs (dahame "according to", lit. "following"). Some, like dele "on top of", "top" are simply identical to nouns. Each postposition governs a certain noun case, with most, like baru "to", dergi "above" and sasa "with" governing the genitive, and two smaller groups governing the dative (e.g. isitala "until") and the ablative (e.g. amala "behind"). Jaka 'together with" takes the nominative. Postpositions may express place (dergi "above"), time (amari "after"), comitative meaning (emgi "with"), causality (jalinde "for the sake of"), similarity (gele "like") or restriction (only teile "only", governing the genitive case, e.g. damu ilan sarhan’i teile ilan boo de tehe "only three women lived in three houses", lit. "only of three women only ...". Postpositions may govern participles, which then have the meaning of verbal nouns, and the postpositions themselves acquire a function similar to that of conjunctions (sain ehe be tuwaha manggi "after having seen", from manggi "with, towards").

=== Conjunctions ===
Some conjunctions coincide with adverbs (e.g. damu "only", "but", geli "also", "and", jai "again", "and', eici "perhaps", "or"). Others are originally case forms or converbs (bade "when", lit. "in the place", bici "if", lit. "if it is (so)", bihede "when", lit. "in having become (so)").

== See also ==
- List of manchurologists
