= Bala language (China) =

Southern Tungusic language

Bala
- bani
- Native to: northeastern China
- Region: Heilongjiang Province and Jilin Province
- Ethnicity: Bala
- Extinct: 1982
- Language family: Tungusic: Southern; Jurchenic; Bala
- Writing system: sometimes transcribed with Chinese characters

Language codes
- ISO 639-3: None (mis)
- Glottolog: bala1242
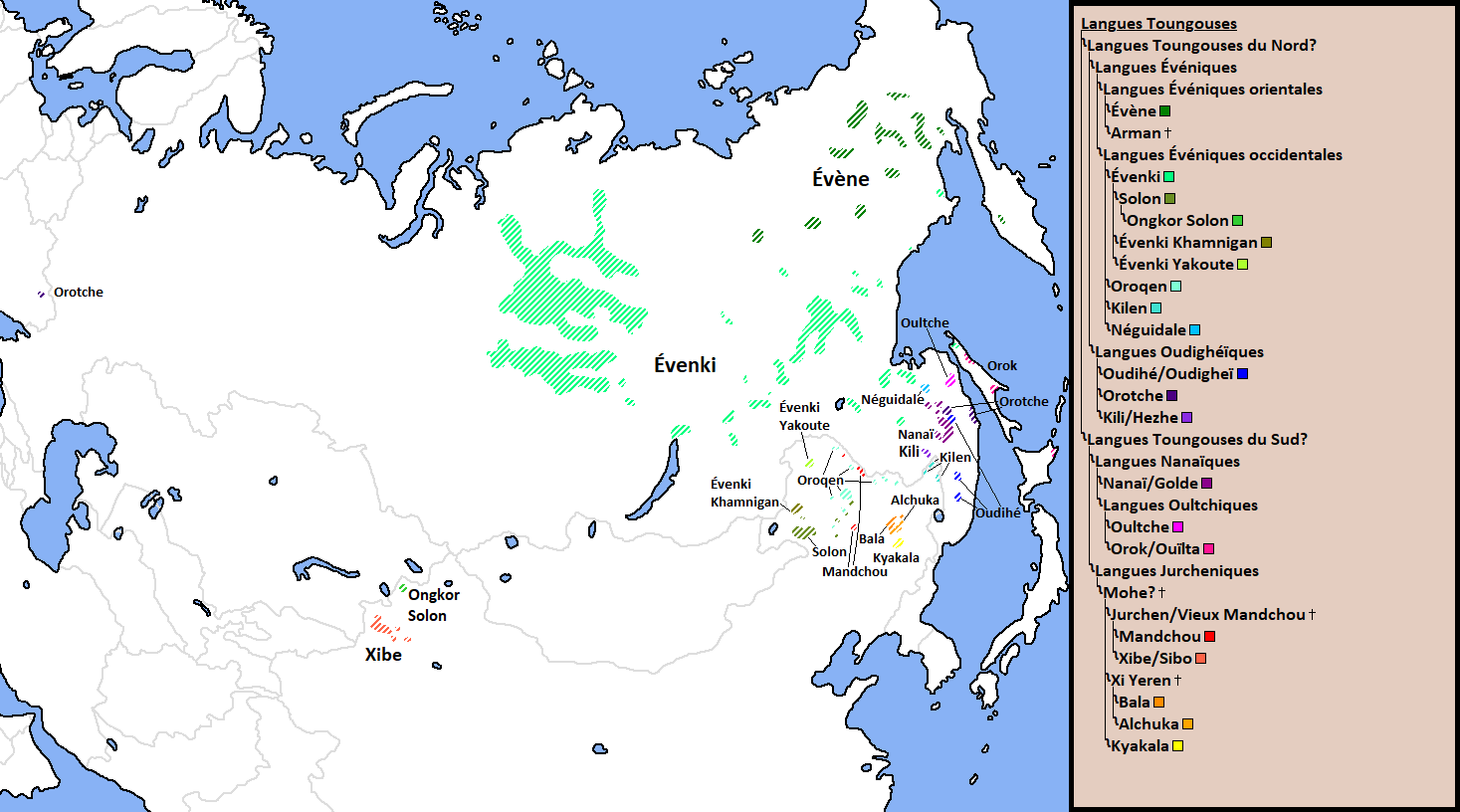
- Map of the Tungusic languages. Bala

The Bala language (Chinese: 巴拉語; pinyin: Bālāyǔ) is a possibly extinct Tungusic language that was spoken in and around the Zhangguangcai Range of Heilongjiang Province, Northeastern China. No standard orthography exists for the language, although manuscripts have occasionally recorded Bala words using Chinese characters.

== Classification ==
Bala clearly belongs to the Jurchenic language subgroup of Southern Tungusic languages, but its exact position within Jurchenic remains to be determined. Bala is more closely related to Jurchen than it is to Manchu and retains many archaic features. It reportedly became extinct in 1982, but it is unknown whether there could be rememberers of the language still alive today.

In addition to influences from Northeastern Mandarin and Manchu, Bala may also have been influenced by Southern Nanai languages such as Kilen.

== Distribution ==
Originally spoken by mountain dwellers who claimed to have fled to the Zhangguangcai Mountains to flee from the late 16th-century Manchu campaigns of Nurhaci, Bala speakers later scattered into the plains to the west and south of the mountain range, with some speakers also moving to various villages in northern Jilin Province. Bala villages in Heilongjiang and Jilin provinces include 阿城 Āchéng, 巴彦 Bāyàn, 宾县 Bīn Xiàn, 方正 Fāngzhèng, 呼兰 Hūlán, 木兰 Mùlán, 尚志 Shàngzhì, 双城 Shuāngchéng, 通河 Tōnghé, 五常 Wǔcháng, and 延寿 Yánshòu, 额穆 Émù, 官地 Guāndì, 榆树 Yúshù, and 蛟河 Jiāohé.

== Documentation ==
The Bala language has been documented by 穆晔骏 Mù Yèjùn (also known as 穆尔察晔骏 Mù'ěrchá Yèjùn, or 穆尔察安布隆阿 Mù'ěrchá Ānbùlóngā; 1926‒1989). Additional linguistic data has also been collected by 李可漫 Lǐ Kěmàn and her father 李果钧 Lǐ Guǒjūn.
