= Jurchenic languages =

Tungusic language subgroup

Jurchenic
- Manchuric, Manchu–Jurchen
- Geographic distribution: Northeastern China
- Linguistic classification: Tungusic: Southern; Jurchenic
- Subdivisions: Jurchen† • Manchu • Xibe; Bala†; Alchuka†; Chinese Kyakala†

Language codes
- Glottolog: manc1250

The Jurchenic languages (also known as the Manchuric languages) form a subgroup of Tungusic languages of northeastern China.

== Languages ==
- Jurchenic languages
  - Jurchen
    - Manchu
    - Xibe
  - Bala †
  - Alchuka †
  - Chinese Kyakala †

Bala, Alchuka, and Chinese Kyakala are extinct Jurchenic languages that were documented in the 1980s. They preserve many archaic features that are highly crucial for the historical-comparative study of Tungusic languages.
