= Chen Mingyuan =

Chinese scholar

- Born: January 5, 1941; Shanghai, China
- Education: ShanghaiTech University
- Scientific career
- Fields: Linguistics, Mathematics, Informatics, Computer Science Poetry
- Workplaces: Beijing Language and Culture University

Chen Mingyuan (Chinese: 陈明远; pinyin: Chén Míngyuǎn, born January 5, 1941, Shanghai, China) is a Chinese scholar who works in various disciplines such as linguistics, mathematics, informatics, computer sciences, and modern poetry. On April 23, 1989, Chen gave a speech at Peking University, expressing his support for the student movements and criticisms of the government. This speech was considered a trigger for the later escalation of the 1989 Tiananmen Square protests and massacre.

== Early life ==
Chen was born on January 5, 1941, in Shanghai. Chen graduated from Shanghai Middle School in 1958, and then earned his mathematics degree at ShanghaiTech University in 1963. Chen also formed a cross-age friendship in his adolescence with the prominent scholar and poet, Guo Moruo because of their shared interests in poetry writing. Later, he studied Chinese linguistics at Peking University. In 1978, he was assigned a position at the Institute of Acoustics, Chinese Academy of Sciences (Zhongguo kexueyuan shengxue yanjiusuo) as an associate researcher. In 1982, Chen became a professor in the department of linguistics in Beijing Language and Culture College (currently Beijing Language and Culture University). His book The Economic Life of Liberators (Heyi weisheng: Wenhuamingren de jingji beijing ) was considered the best published work on the economic status of such prominent scholars such as Lu Xun, Kang Youwei, and Cai Yuanpei.

Chen was accused of being a counterrevolutionary activist during the Cultural Revolution because his poetry style was similar to that of Mao Zedong. Chen then wrote a letter to the government explaining himself, and Zhou Enlai and Zhu De both agreed that charge could be dismissed if Mao was willing to be lenient. However, Mao refused to comment. Thus, Chen was imprisoned twice during the Cultural Revolution. He was released after the death of Mao. The government officially rehabilitated Chen in 1978.

== During the protests ==
Chen openly supported the student protests in 1989. When students became hesitant to continue their protests after mourning the death of Hu Yaobang, Chen encouraged them not to give up, but to continue their actions. On April 23, 1989, Chen gave an emotional speech at the Triangle in Peking University to the students.

In his speech, Chen stated that intellectuals and students must not stay silent but speak out. First of all, Chen criticized the official mouthpieces such as China Central Television (CCTV) which falsely labelled the student protests as being anti-government in nature. Chen argued that the demonstration, petition, and the mourning for Hu Yaobang were spontaneous actions and there were no "black hands" behind them. Thus, Chen described CCTV as the shameless mouthpiece of the government, who had lost their consciences and had lied to the public for decades. Furthermore, Chen argued that social problems such as inflation, profiteering businesses, insufficient educational funds, and wealth polarization were caused by the immoral and corrupted officials and their relatives. The government restricted freedom of speech and democracy because officials feared their scandals would be exposed. To conclude, Chen encouraged students to continue their actions such as boycotting classes and participating demonstrations and to refuse comprise with the government. At the very end of his speech, he shouted the slogan "give us liberty or give us death" and "long live students" to the protestors. According to Chai Ling's memoir, Chen's speech was "interrupted many times by thunderous applause."

During his speech, Chen compared himself to Wen Yiduo, a scholar who was assassinated by the Kuomintang secret agencies because of his anti-government speech during the Chinese Civil War in 1946. As Chen said: “I will be responsible for every word I said, and I am not afraid of any possible consequence including death. I am already forty-eight years old now, I am luckier than Mr. Wen who had sacrificed his life when he was forty-seven."

Chen's speech was recorded and later disseminated to all major universities in Beijing and other cities as well. Wang Dan, one prominent student leader, recalled that students' confidence and motivation were restored after hearing Chen's expressive speech. Student leaders such as Liu Gang hoped other prominent scholars would also give similar speeches to students, but most scholars rejected the request and thought that Chen was too radical. Fang Lizhi, another famous scholar in Beijing, consistently warned Liu against the radicalization of students by speakers and scholars like Chen, or else some unwanted consequences might occur .

== After the protest ==
Chen was arrested after the crackdown on the student protests, and was detained in Qincheng Prison, a maximum-security prison in Changping, Beijing, with other dissenters including Liu Xiaobo and Liu Gang. According to Liu Gang's memoir, Chen pretended to be mentally ill and declared that all his wrong behaviors had been caused by his uncontrollable madness. Chen was eventually released, but the length of his sentence and the time of his release remain unknown.

Guo Moruo's son, Guo Pingying, sued against Chen in 1997 because Chen called himself the co-author of Xin Chao, a collection of modern poems translated and written by Guo Moruo. Three former secretaries of Guo Moruo testified that there was no collaboration between Guo and Chen for this book. Chen lost the case and abandoned his appeal in June 1997. In 2008, Chen criticized a prominent scholar of Chinese linguistics and cultures, Yu Qiuyu by arguing that Yu misused the concepts of culture and civilization to justify his pseudo-proposition that Chinese culture was the only continuous culture in the world in the last 3,000 years.

== Bibliography of Chen's works ==
- Zhongguohua yuyin jichu 中国话语音基础 [Rudiments of Chinese Phonetics] (Beijing : Waijiao chuban she, 1983).
- Yuyanxue he xiandai kexue 语言学和现代科学 [Linguistics and Modern Science] (Chengdu : Sichuan renmin chuban she, 1984).
- Wangnian jiao: wo yu Guo Moruo, Tian Han de jiaowang 忘年交: 我与郭沫若, 田汉的交往 [The Cross-Age Friendship: Guo Moruo, Tian Han, and Me] (Shanghai: Xuelin chuban she, 1999).
- Zhishi fenzi yu renminbi shidai : "Wenhua ren de jingji shenghuo" xubian 知识分子与人民币时代 : 《文化人的经济生活》续编 [Intellectuals and the Time of Renminbi: Continuation of the Economic Life of Liberators] (Shanghai: Wenhui chuban she, 2006).
- Heyi weisheng: wenhua mingren de jingji beijing 何以为生: 文化名人的经济背景 [The Economic Life of Liberators] ( Beijing: Xinhua chuban she, 2007).
- Xiandai shi jiben gong 现代诗基本功 [The Basic Skills of Modern Poetry] (Hong Kong: Taishan wenyi chuban she, 2011).
- Zhishi fenzi de gexing fenxi 知识分子的个性分析 [The Analysis of Intellectuals' Personality] (Xi'an : Shanxi renmin chuban she, 2013).
