= Synthetic morphology =

Synthetic morphology is a sub-discipline of the broader field of synthetic biology.

In standard synthetic biology, artificial gene networks are introduced into cells, inputs (e.g. chemicals, light) are applied to those networks, and the networks perform logical operations on them and output the result of the operation as the activity of an enzyme or as the amount of green fluorescent protein. Using this approach, synthetic biologists have demonstrated the ability of their gene networks to perform Boolean computation, to hold a memory, and to generate pulses and oscillation.

Synthetic morphology extends this idea by adding output modules that alter the shape or social behaviour of cells in response to the state of the artificial gene network. For example, instead of just making a fluorescent protein, a gene network may switch on an adhesion molecule so that cells stick to each other, or activate a motility system so that cells move. It has been argued that the formation of properly-shaped tissues by mammalian cells involves mainly a set of about ten basic cellular events (cell proliferation, cell death, cell adhesion, differential adhesion, cell de-adhesion, cell fusion, cell locomotion, chemotaxis, haptotaxis, cell wedging). Broadly similar lists exist for tissues of plants, fungi etc. In principle, therefore, a fairly small set of output modules might allow biotechnologists to 'program' cells to produce artificially-designed arrangements, shapes and eventually 'tissues'.

The term synthetic morphology was introduced to the peer reviewed scientific literature in 2008 and is now becoming more widely used both in peer-reviewed literature and texts.
