= Kyakala language (China) =

Tungusic language

Kyakala
- Region: Northeastern China
- Ethnicity: Kyakala
- Extinct: 1980s
- Language family: Tungusic: Southern; Jurchenic; Kyakala
- Writing system: None

Language codes
- ISO 639-3: None (mis)
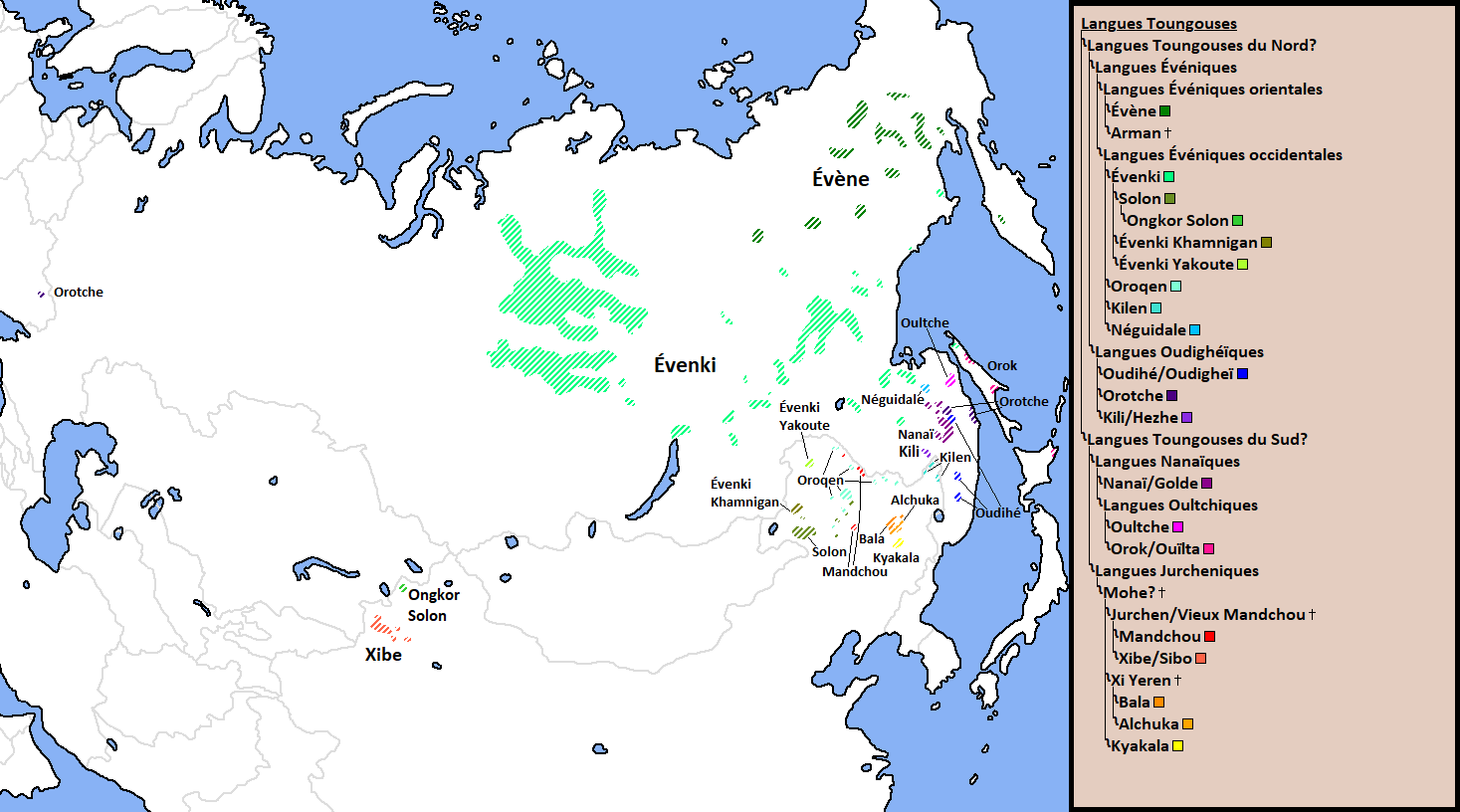
- Map of the Tungusic languages. Kyakala

Chinese Kyakala (Chinese: 恰喀拉; pinyin: Qiàkālā) is an extinct Tungusic language that was spoken in northeastern China.

It is not to be confused with Russian Kyakala or Kekar, a southern Udeghe language or dialect cluster that was spoken in Far East Russia. In contrast, Chinese Kyakala belongs in the Jurchenic subgroup.

== Documentation ==
Chinese Kyakala has been documented in Mu & Ma (1983); Mu’ercha & Mu’ercha (1983); Mu’ercha & Meng (1986); and Mu (1987).

More recent discussions of Chinese Kyakala include Gu (2018); Hölzl (2018); and Hölzl & Hölzl (2019).
