= List of political entities in the 4th century =

Political entities in the 3rd century – Political entities in the 5th century – Political entities by year

This is a list of political entities in the 4th century (301–400) AD.

== Political entities ==
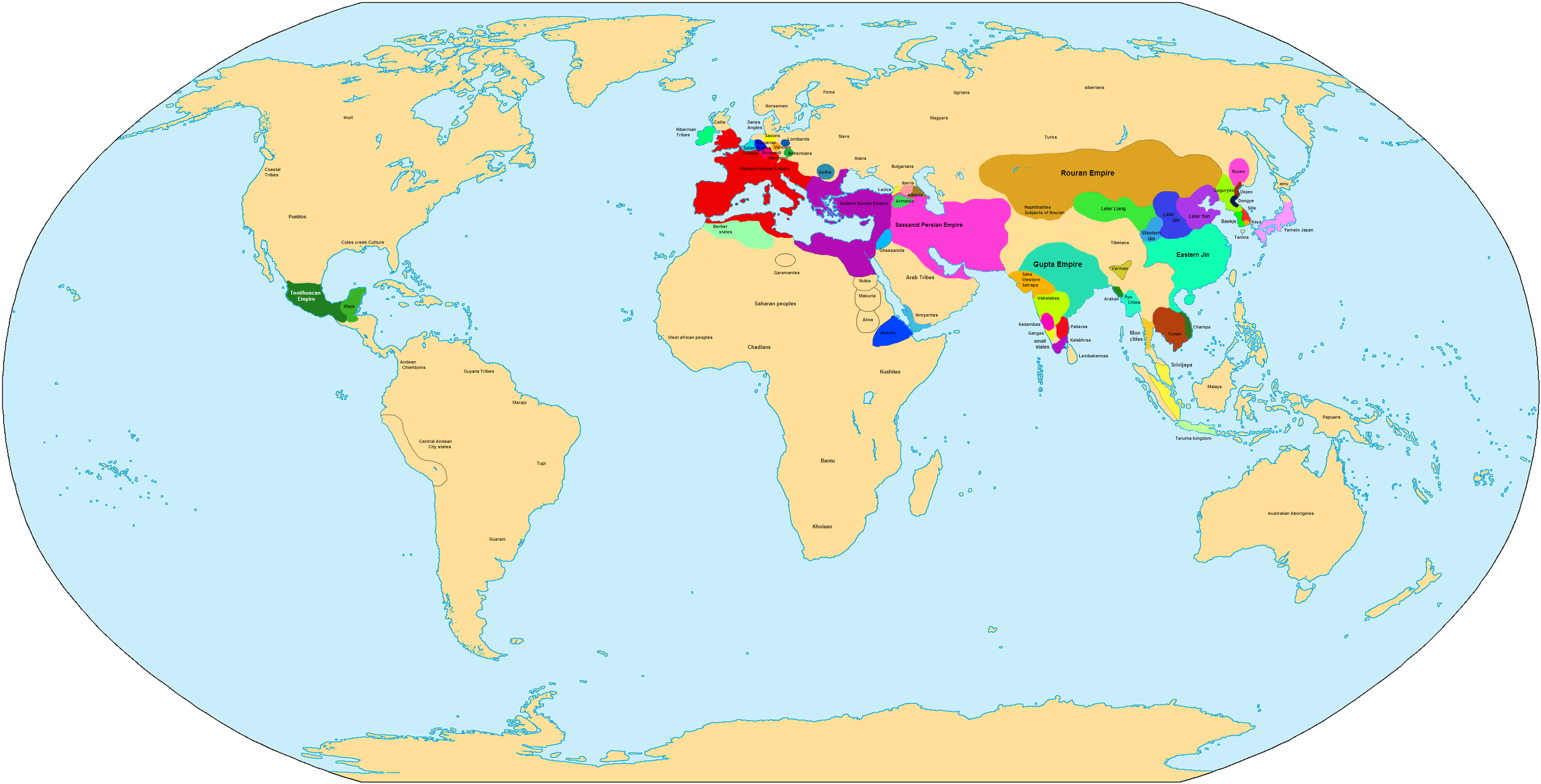
Map of the world in 400 AD

Name	Capital(s)	State type	Existed	Location
Sao civilisation	Various	Tribal city states	6th century BC – 16th century AD	Africa: Central
Garamantes	Garama	Tribal confederation/empire	500 BC – 700 AD	Africa: North
Kingdom of Aksum	Aksum	Kingdom	c.100 – c.940 AD	Africa: Northeast
Blemmyes		Tribal Kingdom	600 BC – 8th century AD	Africa: Northeast
Kush	Kerma; Napata; Meroe	Kingdom	1070 BC – 350 AD	Africa: Northeast
Makuria	Dongola	Kingdom	340 – 1312 AD	Africa: Northeast
Nobatia	Pachoras	Kingdom	350 – 650 AD	Africa: Northeast
Gaetulia		Tribal confederation	c. 350 BC – 550 AD	Africa: Northwest
Mauretania	Julia Caesara	Kingdom/client kingdom	285 BC – 431 AD	Africa: Northwest
Ghana Empire	Koumbi Saleh	Empire	c. 400 – 1235 AD	Africa: West
Maya	Various	Kingdom City States	2000 BC – 900AD	Americas: Central
Zapotec	Various	Kingdom City States	700 BC – 1521 AD	Americas: Central
Pueblo	Various	Tribal chiefdoms	12th century BC – 14th century AD	Americas: North
Teotihuacan Empire	Teotihuacan	Empire	100 BC – 8th century AD	Americas: North
Moche	Moche-Trujillo	United Independent Polities	100 – 800 AD	Americas: South
Nazca	Various	Tribal chiefdom's	100 BC – 800 AD	Americas: South
Tiwanaku Empire	Tiwanaku	Empire	300 – 1000 AD	Americas: South
Byzantine Empire	Constantinople	Empire	395 – 1453 AD	Europe: Balkans, Asia: West; Africa: Northeast
Getae		Tribal kingdom	7th century BC – 4th century AD	Europe: Balkans
Paeonia		Principality/kingdom/client	535 BC – 681 AD	Europe: Balkans
Airgíalla	Clogher	Tribal federation/kingdom	331 – 1590 AD	Europe: British Isles
Cai		Tribal kingdom	25 – 871 AD	Europe: British Isles
Ce		Tribal kingdom	1st century – 900 AD	Europe: British Isles
Connacht		Tribal chiefdom/kingdom	c. 10th century BC – 1474 AD	Europe: British Isles
Cornovii		Tribal kingdom	4th century BC – 343 AD	Europe: British Isles
Dumnonia	Isca Dumnoniorum	Dukedom/principality	290 – 875 AD	Europe: British Isles
Fortriu		Tribal kingdom	1 – 850 AD	Europe: British Isles
Iverni	Ivernis	Tribal federated chiefdoms	500 BC – 400 AD	Europe: British Isles
Meath	Dublin	Kingdom	1st century – 1173 AD	Europe: British Isles
Osraige	Kilkenny	Kingdom	150 – 1185 AD	Europe: British Isles
Pictland		Kingdom	250 BC – 850 AD	Europe: British Isles
Cimmerian Bosporus	Panticapaeum	Kingdom/client	480 BC – 370 AD	Europe: East
Gelonia	Gelonos	Tribal kingdom	5th century BC – 5th century AD	Europe: East
Huns		Nomadic confederation	1st century – 370 AD	Europe: East; Asia: Central
Magyar		Tribal confederation/principality	1100 BC – 895 AD	Europe: East
Sarmatians	Tarki (Makhachkala)	Tribal confederation	450BC – 400 AD	Europe: East
Venedae		Tribal confederation	400 BC – 7th century AD	Europe: East
Roman Empire	Rome, Constantinople	Empire	27 BC – 1453 AD	Europe: South, West, Balkans, British Isles; Africa: North; Asia: West
San Marino	San Marino	Republic	301 AD – present	Europe: South
Alamannia		Kingdom	213 AD – 496 AD	Europe: West
Armorica		Kingdom/dukedom	343 – 1532 AD	Europe: West
Franks	Various	Tribal confederation	210 – 481 AD	Europe: West
Saxons (Continental)		Tribal confederation	5th century BC – 754 AD	Europe: West
Suebi		Tribal confederation	60 BC – 409 AD	Europe: West
Vandals		Tribal chiefdoms	2nd century BC – 409 AD	Europe: West
Western Roman Empire	Mediolanum, Ravenna	Empire	395 – 476 AD	Europe: South, West, Balkans, British Isles; Africa: North
Caspiane		Tribal Kingdom/client	650 BC – 387 AD	Eurasian: Caucasus
Caucasian Albania	Kabalak, Partav	Kingdom/client	65 BC – 628 AD	Eurasian: Caucasus
Iberia	Various	Kingdom	302 BC – 580 AD	Eurasian: Caucasus
Lazica	Phasis	Kingdom/client	1st century BC – 7th century AD	Eurasian: Caucasus
Adiabene	Arbela	Kingdom/client	15 – 310 AD	Asia: West
Armenia	Van	Kingdom	553 BC – 428AD	Asia: West
Carmania		Kingdom/client	600 BC – 651 AD	Asia: West
Corduene		Principality/Kingdom/client	800 BC – 653 AD	Asia: West
Gardman	Parisos	Principality/Kingdom/client	66 – 428 AD	Asia: West
Ghassanid	Balka, Harith, Petra, Sideir	Kingdom/client	220 – 712 AD	Asia: West
Hadhramaut	Shabwah	Kingdom	700 BC – 320 AD	Asia: West
Himyarite Kingdom	Zafar	Kingdom	110 BC–570 AD	Asia: West
Kindah	Qaryat Dhāt Kāhil	Tribal kingdom	2nd century BC – 525 AD	Asia: West
Lakhmids	Al-Hirah	Kingdom	300 – 602 AD	Asia: West
Sasanian Persian Empire	Estakhr, Ctesiphon	Empire	224 – 637 AD	Asia: West, South
Zabdicene		Principality/client	780 BC – 5th century AD	Asia: West
Afrighids	Kath	Kingdom/client	305 – 995 AD	Asia: Central
Fergana	Khokand	Kingdom	220 BC – 590 AD	Asia: Central
Kangju		Tribal Federation	280 BC – 585 AD	Asia: Central
Kingdom of Shule	Kashgar	Kingdom/client	80 – 850 AD	Asia: Central
Khotan	Khotan	Kingdom	56 – 1006 AD	Asia: Central
Kucha	Kucha	Buddhist Kingdom	46 – 658 AD	Asia: Central
Rouran Khaganate		Confederation	330 – 555 AD	Asia: Central, East
Sumpa		Tribal chiefdom/client	1600 BC – 7th century AD	Asia: Central
Tuyuhun	Fuqi	Nomadic kingdom	285 – 670 AD	Asia: Central
Xionites		Tribal federation	320 – late 5th century AD	Asia: Central
Anuradhapura	Anuradhapura	Kingdom	377 BC – 1017 AD	Asia: South
Ay	Aykudi	Kingdom	4th century BC – 12th century AD	Asia: South
Chera Kingdom		Kingdom	5th century BC – 1102 AD	Asia: South
Gupta Empire	Pataliputra	Empire	320 – 620 AD	Asia: South
Indo-Scythians	Sigal, Taxila, Mathura	Kingdom	200 BC – 400 AD	Asia: South
Kamarupa	Various	Kingdom	350 – 1140 AD	Asia: South
Kushan Empire	Various	Empire	30 – 375 AD	Asia: South, Central
Mushika	Ezhimalai	Kingdom	3rd century BC – 4th century AD	Asia: South
Pallava Empire	Kanchi	Empire	250 BC – 800 AD	Asia: South
Pundra	Pundravardhana	Kingdom	1300 BC – 550 AD	Asia: South
Rajarata	Various	Kingdom	377 BC – 1310 AD	Asia: South
Ruhuna	Magama	Principality	200 BC – 450 AD	Asia: South
Satavahana Empire	Vatsagulma	Empire	250 – 500 AD	Asia: South
Vanga	Gange	Kingdom	1300 BC – 580 AD	Asia: South
Western Ganga dynasty	Kolar, Talakad	Kingdom	350 – 1000 AD	Asia: South
Western Satraps	Ozone, Barygaza	Kingdom	35 – 405 AD	Asia: South
Champa	Various	Kingdom	192 – 1832 AD	Asia: Southeast
Chi Tu		Kingdom	100 BC – 7th century AD	Asia: Southeast
Funan	Various	Kingdom	60 – 550 AD	Asia: Southeast
Gangga Negara	Gangga Negara	Kingdom	2nd – 11th centuries AD	Asia: Southeast
Langkasuka	Kedah, Pattani	Kingdom	100 – 1516 AD	Asia: Southeast
Melayu Kingdom	Jambi	Kingdom	4th – 13th centuries AD	Asia: Southeast
Pyu city-states	Sri Ksetra	Federated city states	250 BC – 1085 AD	Asia: Southeast
Tarumanagara	Sundapura	Kingdom	358 – 669 AD	Asia: Southeast
Thaton Kingdom	Thaton	Kingdom	300 BC – 1085 AD	Asia: Southeast
Cheng-Han	Chengdu	Kingdom	304 – 347 AD	Asia: East, China
Chouchi	Lüeyang	Principality	184 – 511 AD	Asia: East, China
Duan		Tribal chiefdom/dukedom	250 – 338 AD	Asia: East, China
Han-Zhao	Lishi	Kingdom	304 – 329 AD	Asia: East, China
Khitans	Shangjing	Kingdom/client	388 – 1211 AD	Asia: East, China
Northern Liang	Jiankang	Kingdom/client	397 – 460 AD	Asia: East, China
Northern Wei	Shengle	Empire	386 – 585 AD	Asia: East, China
Western Qin	Yongshicheng	Kingdom	385 – 431 AD	Asia: East, China
Yamato	Various	Kingdom	3rd century AD – present	Asia: East, Japan
Baekje	Various	Kingdom	18 BC – 660 AD	Asia: East, Korean Peninsula
Buyeo	Buyeoseong	Kingdom	189 BC – 494 AD	Asia: East, Korean Peninsula
Dongye		Chiefdom	3rd century BC – 5th century AD	Asia: East, Korean Peninsula
Gaya confederacy	Gaya	Confederacy	42 – 562 AD	Asia: East, Korean Peninsula
Goguryeo	Various	Kingdom	37 BC – 668 AD	Asia: East, Korean Peninsula
Okjeo		Tribal state	2nd century BC – 5th century AD	Asia: East, Korean Peninsula
Samhan		Confederacy	1st century BC – 4th century AD	Asia: East, Korean Peninsula
Siljik		Kingdom	102 – 6th century AD	Asia: East, Korean Peninsula
Silla	Gyeongju	Kingdom	55 BC – 935 AD	Asia: East, Korean Peninsula

== See also ==
- List of Bronze Age states
- List of Iron Age states
- List of Classical Age states
- List of states during Late Antiquity
- List of states during the Middle Ages

List of political entities in the 4th century
Preceded by 3rd century	Political entities of the 4th century	Succeeded by 5th century
