= List of political entities in the 7th century =

Political entities in the 6th century – Political entities in the 8th century – Political entities by year

This is a list of political entities in the 7th century (601–700) AD.

== Political entities ==
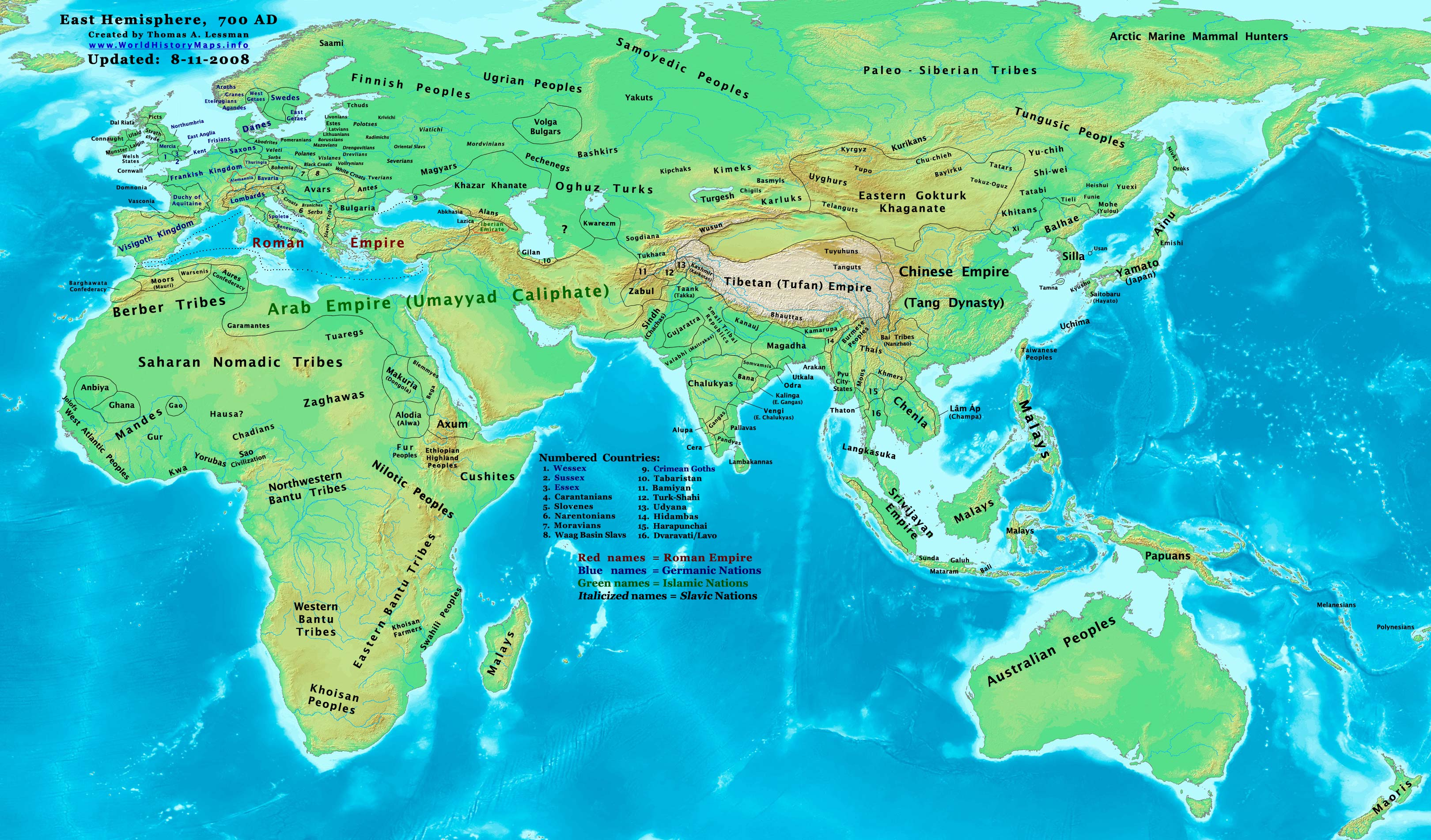
Map of the Old World in 700 AD

Name	Capital(s)	State type	Existed	Location
Garamantes	Garama	Tribal Confederation/Empire	500 BC – 700 AD	Africa: North
Umayyad Caliphate	Dammascus, Harran	Empire (religious)	661 – 750 AD	Africa: North; Asia: West; Europe: West
Kingdom of Aksum	Aksum	Kingdom	c. 100 – c.940 AD	Africa: Northeast
Alodia	Soba	Empire	680 – 1504 AD	Africa: Northeast
Blemmyes		Tribal Kingdom	600 BC – 8th century AD	Africa: Northeast
Makuria	Dongola	Kingdom	340 – 1312 AD	Africa: Northeast
Nobatia	Pachoras	Kingdom	350 – 650 AD	Africa: Northeast
Ghana Empire	Koumbi Saleh	Empire	c. 400 – 1235 AD	Africa: West
Maya	Various	Kingdom City States	2000 BC – 900AD	Americas: Central
Zapotec	Various	Kingdom City States	700 BC – 1521 AD	Americas: Central
Pueblo	Various	Tribal chiefdoms	12th century BC – 14th century AD	Americas: North
Teotihuacan Empire	Teotihuacan	Empire	100 BC – 8th century AD	Americas: North
Cañari	Tumebamba	Tribal Confederacy	500 – 1533 AD	Americas: South
Moche	Moche-Trujillo.	United Independent Polities	100 – 800 AD	Americas: South
Nazca	Various	Tribal chiefdoms	100 BC – 800 AD	Americas: South
Tiwanaku empire	Tiwanaku	Empire	300 – 1000 AD	Americas: South
Wari Empire	Huari	Empire	500 – 1100 AD	Americas: South
Avar Khaganate		Khaganate	567 – 804 AD	Europe: Balkans
Byzantine Empire	Constantinople	Empire	395 – 1453 AD	Europe: Balkans, Asia: West; Africa: Northeast
First Bulgarian Empire	Various	Empire	681 – 1018 AD	Europe: Balkans
Narentines		Tribal chiefdom/countship/dukedom	6th – 10th centuries AD	Europe: Balkans
Paeonia		Principality/Kingdom/Client	535 BC – 681 AD	Europe: Balkans
Principality of Serbia	Various	Principality	7th – 10th centuries	Europe: Balkans
Ailech	Grianán Ailigh	Kingdom	450 – 1283 AD	Europe: British Isles
Airgíalla	Clogher	Tribal Federation/Kingdom	331 – 1590 AD	Europe: British Isles
Bernicia	Bamburgh	Kingdom	420 – 634 AD	Europe: British Isles
Kingdom of Breifne	Croghan	Kingdom	700 – 1256 AD	Europe: British Isles
Brycheiniog	Talgarth	Kingdom	450 – 1045 AD	Europe: British Isles
Cai		Tribal kingdom	25 – 871 AD	Europe: British Isles
Ce		Tribal kingdom	1st century – 900 AD	Europe: British Isles
Ceredigion		Kingdom	475 – 680 AD	Europe: British Isles
Connacht		Tribal chiefdom/kingdom	c. 10th century BC – 1474 AD	Europe: British Isles
Dál Riata	Dunadd	Kingdom	501 – 878 AD	Europe: British Isles
Deira	York	Kingdom	559 – 664 AD	Europe: British Isles
Dumnonia	Isca Dumnoniorum	Dukedom/principality	290 – 875 AD	Europe: British Isles
Dyfed		Kingdom	410 – 910 AD	Europe: British Isles
Kingdom of East Anglia	Rendlesham, Dommoc	Kingdom	6th century – 918 AD	Europe: British Isles
Fortriu		Tribal kingdom	1 – 850 AD	Europe: British Isles
Glywysing	Cardiff	Kingdom	490 – 1063 AD	Europe: British Isles
Gododdin		Kingdom	5th – 8th century AD	Europe: British Isles
Gwent	Caerwent, Porth-is-Coed	Kingdom	420 – 1081 AD	Europe: British Isles
Gwynedd	Various	Kingdom	420 – 1261 AD	Europe: British Isles
Haestingas	Hastings	Tribal kingdom	6th century – 771 AD	Europe: British Isles
Kent	Durovernum	Kingdom	455 – 871 AD	Europe: British Isles
Leinster		Kingdom	436 – 1632 AD	Europe: British Isles
Lindsey	Lindum	Kingdom/Client	410 – 775 AD	Europe: British Isles
Meath	Dublin	Kingdom	1st century – 1173 AD	Europe: British Isles
Mercia	Tamworth	Kingdom	527 – 918 AD	Europe: British Isles
Kingdom of Northumbria	Bamburgh	Kingdom	653 – 954 AD	Europe: British Isles
Osraige	Kilkenny	Kingdom	150 – 1185 AD	Europe: British Isles
Pictland		Kingdom	250 BC – 850 AD	Europe: British Isles
Powys	Various	Kingdom	488 – 1160 AD	Europe: British Isles
Rheged		Kingdom	550 – 650 AD	Europe: British Isles
Strathclyde	Dumbarton, Govan	Kingdom	450 – 1093 AD	Europe: British Isles
Sussex	Selsey	Kingdom	477 – 860 AD	Europe: British Isles
Tyrconnell	Dun na nGall	Kingdom	464 – 1607 AD	Europe: British Isles
Uí Failghe	Rathangan, Daingean	Kingdom	507 – 1550 AD	Europe: British Isles
Ulster		Kingdom	465 – 1177 AD	Europe: British Isles
Wessex	Winchester	Kingdom	519 – 1018 AD	Europe: British Isles
Barsils		Tribal union	600 – 700 AD	Europe: East; Asia, Central
Bulgars	Balkh/Phanagoria	Tribal confederation	c. 5th century – 7th century AD	Europe: East
Khazar Khaganate	Various	Nomadic Kingdom	618 – 1048 AD	Europe: East; Asia, Central; Eurasian: Caucasus
Kutrigurs		Nomadic confederation/client	453 – 8th century AD	Europe: East
Magyar		Tribal Confederation/Principality	1100 BC – 895 AD	Europe: East
Old Great Bulgaria	Phanagoria	Kingdom	632 – 668 AD	Europe: East
Venedae		Tribal Confederation	400 BC – 7th century AD	Europe: East
Volga Bulgaria	Bolghar, Bilär	Kingdom	660 – 1236 AD	Europe: East
Duchy of Benevento after 774, Principality of Benevento	Benevento	Dukedom/Principality/Client	571 – 1074 AD	Europe: South
Kingdom of the Lombards	Pavia	Kingdom	568 – 774 AD	Europe: South
San Marino	San Marino	Republic	301 AD – present	Europe: South
Duchy of Tridentum	Benevento	Dukedom/Principality	574 – 1802 AD	Europe: South
Republic of Venice	Venice	Republic	697 – 1797 AD	Europe: South
Armorica		Kingdom/dukedom	343 – 1532 AD	Europe: West
Austrasia	Metz	Kingdom	511 – 751 AD	Europe: West
Bavaria		Dukedom	508 – 788 AD	Europe: West
Carantania	Karnburg	Principality	658 – 828 AD	Europe: West
Cornouaille		Principality	430 – 1084 AD	Europe: West
Francia	Tournai, Paris	Kingdom/Empire	481 – 843 AD	Europe: West
Frisian Kingdom	Dorestad, Utrecht	Kingdom	600 – 734 AD	Europe: West
Kingdom of Galicia	Santiago de Compostela	Kingdom	409 – 1833 AD	Europe: West
Poher	Vorgium	Principality	520 – 936 AD	Europe: West
Raetia Curiensis	Chur	Bishopric (religious state)	452 – 1160 AD	Europe: West
Saxons (Continental)		Tribal confederation	5th century BC – 754 AD	Europe: West
Duchy of Thuringia		Duchy	631 – 1440 AD	Europe: West
Visigothic Kingdom	Various	Kingdom	418 – 720 AD	Europe: West
Arminiya	Dvin	Principality/client	653 – 884 AD	Eurasian: Caucasus
Caucasian Albania	Kabalak, Partav	Kingdom/Client	65 BC – 628 AD	Eurasian: Caucasus
Principality of Iberia	Tbilisi	Principality	580 – 891 AD	Eurasian: Caucasus
Lazica	Phasis	Kingdom/client	1st century BC – 7th century AD	Eurasian: Caucasus
Sarir	Humraj	Kingdom/Client	453 – 12th century AD	Eurasian: Caucasus
Carmania		Kingdom/client	600 BC – 651 AD	Asia: West
Corduene		Principality/kingdom/client	800 BC – 653 AD	Asia: West
Ghassanid	Balka, Harith, Petra, Sideir	Kingdom/Client	220 – 712 AD	Asia: West
Lakhmids	Al-Hirah	Kingdom	300 – 602 AD	Asia: West
Rashidun Caliphate	Medina, Kuffa	Empire	632 – 661 AD	Asia: West; Africa, Northeast
Sasanian Persian Empire	Estakhr, Ctesiphon	Empire	224 – 637 AD	Asia: West, South
Afrighids	Kath	Kingdom/Client	305 – 995 AD	Asia: Central
Hephthalite Empire	Various	Empire	408 – 670 AD	Asia: Central
Kingdom of Shule	Kashgar	Kingdom/Client	80 – 850 AD	Asia: Central
Khotan	Khotan	Kingdom	56 – 1006 AD	Asia: Central
Kucha	Kucha	Buddhist Kingdom	46 – 658 AD	Asia: Central
Sumpa		Tribal chiefdom/client	1600 BC – 7th century AD	Asia: Central
Tang dynasty	Chang'an, Luoyang	Empire	618 – 907 AD	Asia: East, Central
Tibetan Empire	Lhasa, Pho brang	Empire	618 – 907 AD	Asia: Central, East
Turgesh Khaganate	Balasagun	Nomadic Empire	699 – 766 AD	Asia: Central
Second Turkic Khaganate	Ordu Baliq	Confederation	552 – 747 AD	Asia: Central, East
Turpan	Turpan	Buddhist Kingdom	480 – 640 AD	Asia: Central
Tuyuhun	Fuqi	Nomadic Kingdom	285 – 670 AD	Asia: Central
Anuradhapura	Anuradhapura	Kingdom	377 BC – 1017 AD	Asia: South
Ay	Aykudi	Kingdom	4th century BC – 12th century AD	Asia: South
Kingdom of Bumthang	Chakhar Gutho	Kingdom	7th – 17th centuries AD	Asia: South
Chera Kingdom		Kingdom	5th century BC – 1102 AD	Asia: South
Eastern Chalukyas	Vengi, Rajamundry	Kingdom	624 – 1129 AD	Asia: South
Gauda Kingdom	Karnasuvarna	Kingdom	590 – 626 AD	Asia: South
Gupta Empire	Pataliputra	Empire	320 – 620 AD	Asia: South
Gurjara-Pratihara	Kannauj	Empire	650 – 1036 AD	Asia: South
Harsha	Kanauj	Empire	606 – 647 AD	Asia: South
Kabul Shahi	Kabul, Waihind	Kingdom/Empire	6th century – 1026 AD	Asia: South
Kamarupa	Various	Kingdom	350 – 1140 AD	Asia: South
Maitraka	Vallabhi	Empire	475 – 767 AD	Asia: South
Maukhari	Kannauj	Empire	550s – 8th century AD	Asia: South
Pallava Empire	Kanchi	Empire	250 BC – 800 AD	Asia: South
Rai dynasty	Aror	Empire	489 – 690 AD	Asia: South
Rajarata	Various	Kingdom	377 BC – 1310 AD	Asia: South
Vishnukundina	Indrapalanagara	Empire	420 – 624 AD	Asia: South
Western Ganga dynasty	Kolar, Talakad	Kingdom	350 – 1000 AD	Asia: South
Bruneian Empire	Various	Empire	7th century – 1888 AD	Asia: Southeast
Champa	Various	Kingdom	192 – 1832 AD	Asia: Southeast
Chenla Kingdom	Bhavapura, Isanapura	Kingdom	550 – 706 AD	Asia: Southeast
Chi Tu		Kingdom	100 BC – 7th century AD	Asia: Southeast
Gangga Negara	Gangga Negara	Kingdom	2nd – 11th centuries AD	Asia: Southeast
Langkasuka	Kedah, Pattani	Kingdom	100 – 1516 AD	Asia: Southeast
Lavo Kingdom	Lavo, Ayodhaya	Kingdom	450 – 1388 AD	Asia: Southeast
Melayu Kingdom	Jambi	Kingdom	4th – 13th centuries AD	Asia: Southeast
Pyu city-states	Sri Ksetra	Federated City States	250 BC – 1085 AD	Asia: Southeast
Sunda Kingdom	Various	Kingdom	669 – 1579 AD	Asia: Southeast
Tarumanagara	Sundapura	Kingdom	358 – 669 AD	Asia: Southeast
Thaton Kingdom	Thaton	Kingdom	300 BC – 1085 AD	Asia: Southeast
Khitans	Shangjing	Kingdom/Client	388 – 1211 AD	Asia: East, China
Japan	Various	Empire	3rd century AD – present	Asia: East, Japan
Baekje	Various	Kingdom	18 BC – 660 AD	Asia: East, Korean Peninsula
Balhae	Dongmo	Empire	698 – 926 AD	Asia: East, Korean Peninsula
Goguryeo	Various	Kingdom	37 BC – 668 AD	Asia: East, Korean Peninsula
Silla	Gyeongju	Kingdom	55 BC – 935 AD	Asia: East, Korean Peninsula
Usan		Kingdom	512 – 930 AD	Asia: East, Korean Peninsula
Vạn Xuân	Longbian	Kingdom	544 – 603 AD	Asia: Southeast, Vietnam

== See also ==
- List of Bronze Age states
- List of Iron Age states
- List of Classical Age states
- List of states during Late Antiquity
- List of states during the Middle Ages

List of political entities in the 7th century
Preceded by 6th century	Political entities of the 7th century	Succeeded by 8th century
