= List of political entities in the 8th century =

Political entities in the 7th century – Political entities in the 9th century – Political entities by year

This is a list of political entities in the 8th century (701–800) AD.

== Political entities ==
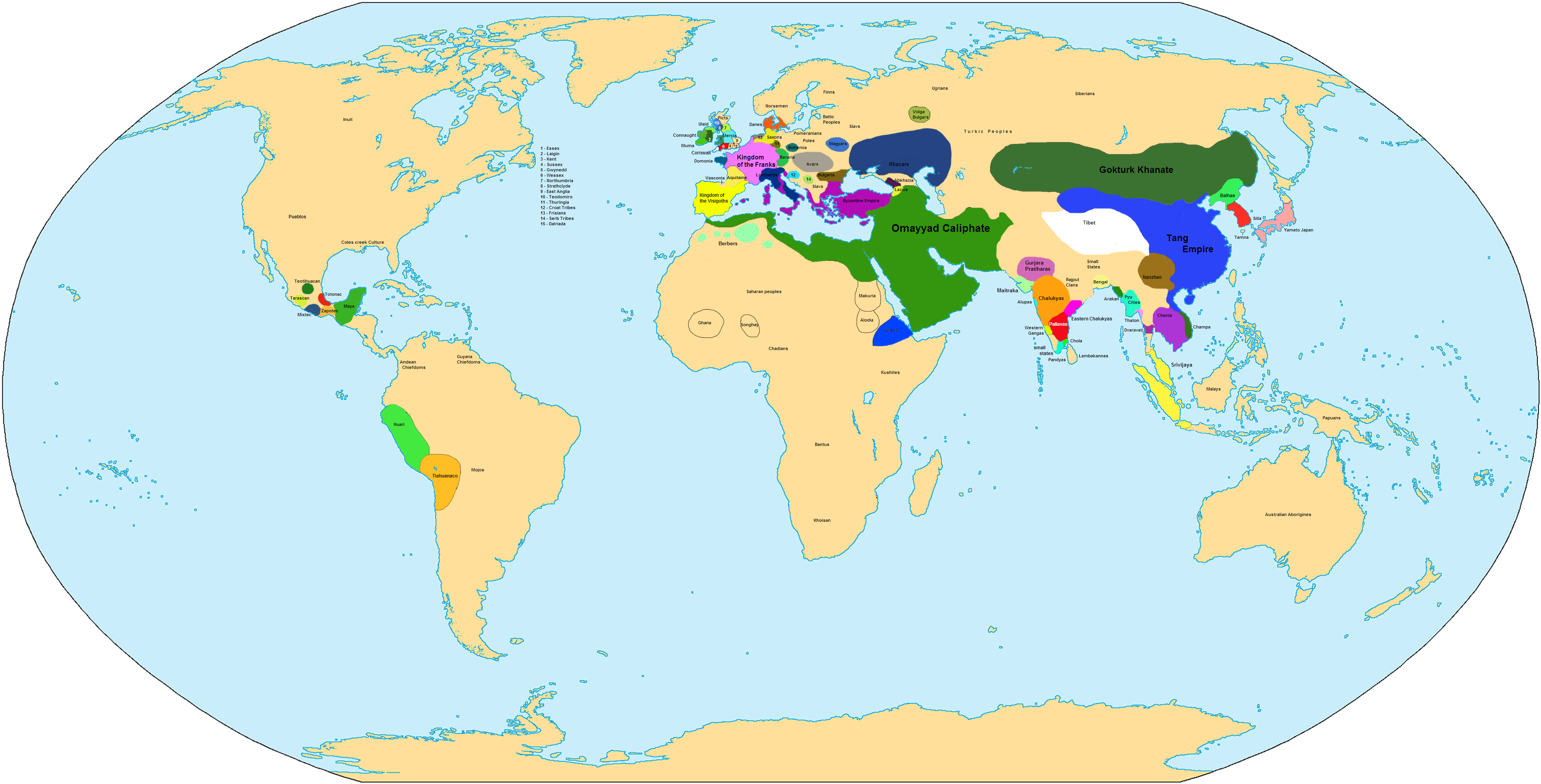
Map of the world in 700 AD

| Name | Capital(s) | State type | Existed | Location |
|---|---|---|---|---|
| Abbasid Caliphate | Baghdad | Empire | 750 – 1256 AD | Africa: North; Asia: West |
| Umayyad Caliphate | Dammascus, Harran | Empire | 661 – 750 AD | Africa: North; Asia: West; Europe: West |
| Bashmurid | Bashmur | Principality | c. 720 – 832 AD | Africa: North |
| Kanem Empire | Njimi | Empire | c. 700 – 1387 AD | Africa: North Central |
| Kingdom of Aksum | Aksum | Kingdom | c.100 – c.940 AD | Africa: Northeast |
| Alodia | Soba | Empire | 680 – 1504 AD | Africa: Northeast |
| Blemmyes | | Tribal Kingdom | 600 BC – 8th century AD | Africa: Northeast |
| Makuria | Dongola | Kingdom | 340 – 1312 AD | Africa: Northeast |
| Idrisid dynasty | Fez | Empire | 788 – 985 AD | Africa: Northwest |
| Ghana Empire | Koumbi Saleh | Empire | c. 400 – 1235 AD | Africa: West |
| Maya | Various | Kingdom city states | 2000 BC – 900AD | Americas: Central |
| Zapotec | Various | Kingdom city states | 700 BC – 1521 AD | Americas: Central |
| Pueblo | Various | Tribal chiefdoms | 12th cent. BC – 14th cent. AD | Americas: North |
| Teotihuacan Empire | Teotihuacan | Empire | 100 BC – 8th century AD | Americas: North |
| Cañari | Tumebamba | Tribal confederacy | 500 – 1533 AD | Americas: South |
| Moche | Moche-Trujillo | United independent polities | 100 – 800 AD | Americas: South |
| Nazca | Various | Tribal chiefdoms | 100 BC – 800 AD | Americas: South |
| Tiwanaku empire | Tiwanaku | Empire | 300 – 1000 AD | Americas: South |
| Wari Empire | Huari | Empire | 500 – 1100 AD | Americas: South |
| Avar Khaganate | | Khaganate | 567 – 804 AD | Europe: Balkans |
| Byzantine Empire | Constantinople | Empire | 395 – 1453 AD | Europe: Balkans, Asia: West; Africa: Northeast |
| First Bulgarian Empire | Various | Empire | 681 – 1018 AD | Europe: Balkans |
| Narentines | | Tribal chiefdom/countship/dukedom | 6th – 10th centuries AD | Europe: Balkans |
| Principality of Serbia | Various | Principality | 7th – 10th centuries | Europe: Balkans |
| Ailech | Grianán Ailigh | Kingdom | 450 – 1283 AD | Europe: British Isles |
| Airgíalla | Clogher | Tribal Federation/Kingdom | 331 – 1590 AD | Europe: British Isles |
| Kingdom of Breifne | Croghan | Kingdom | 700 – 1256 AD | Europe: British Isles |
| Brycheiniog | Talgarth | Kingdom | 450 – 1045 AD | Europe: British Isles |
| Cai | | Tribal kingdom | 25 – 871 AD | Europe: British Isles |
| Ce | | Tribal kingdom | 1st century – 900 AD | Europe: British Isles |
| Connacht | | Tribal chiefdom/kingdom | c. 10th century BC – 1474 AD | Europe: British Isles |
| Dál Riata | Dunadd | Kingdom | 501 – 878 AD | Europe: British Isles |
| Dumnonia | Isca Dumnoniorum | Dukedom/principality | 290 – 875 AD | Europe: British Isles |
| Dyfed | | Kingdom | 410 – 910 AD | Europe: British Isles |
| Kingdom of East Anglia | Rendlesham, Dommoc | Kingdom | 6th C – 918 AD | Europe: British Isles |
| Fortriu | | Tribal kingdom | 1 – 850 AD | Europe: British Isles |
| Glywysing | Cardiff | Kingdom | 490 – 1063 AD | Europe: British Isles |
| Gododdin | | Kingdom | 5th – 8th century AD | Europe: British Isles |
| Gwent | Caerwent, Porth-is-Coed | Kingdom | 420 – 1081 AD | Europe: British Isles |
| Gwynedd | Various | Kingdom | 420 – 1261 AD | Europe: British Isles |
| Haestingas | Hastings | Tribal kingdom | 6th century – 771 AD | Europe: British Isles |
| Kent | Durovernum | Kingdom | 455 – 871 AD | Europe: British Isles |
| Leinster | | Kingdom | 436 – 1632 AD | Europe: British Isles |
| Lindsey | Lindum | Kingdom/Client | 410 – 775 AD | Europe: British Isles |
| Meath | Dublin | Kingdom | 1st century – 1173 AD | Europe: British Isles |
| Mercia | Tamworth | Kingdom | 527 – 918 AD | Europe: British Isles |
| Kingdom of Northumbria | Bamburgh | Kingdom | 653 – 954 AD | Europe: British Isles |
| Osraige | Kilkenny | Kingdom | 150 – 1185 AD | Europe: British Isles |
| Pictland | | Kingdom | 250 BC – 850 AD | Europe: British Isles |
| Powys | Various | Kingdom | 488 – 1160 AD | Europe: British Isles |
| Strathclyde | Dumbarton, Govan | Kingdom | 450 – 1093 AD | Europe: British Isles |
| Sussex | Selsey | Kingdom | 477 – 860 AD | Europe: British Isles |
| Tyrconnell | Dun na nGall | Kingdom | 464 – 1607 AD | Europe: British Isles |
| Uí Failghe | Rathangan, Daingean | Kingdom | 507 – 1550 AD | Europe: British Isles |
| Ulster | | Kingdom | 465 – 1177 AD | Europe: British Isles |
| Wessex | Winchester | Kingdom | 519 – 1018 AD | Europe: British Isles |
| Khazar Khaganate | Various | Nomadic Kingdom | 618 – 1048 AD | Europe: East; Asia, Central; Eurasian: Caucasus |
| Kutrigurs | | Nomadic confederation/client | 453 – 8th century AD | Europe: East |
| Magyar | | Tribal Confederation/Principality | 1100 BC – 895 AD | Europe: East |
| Volga Bulgaria | Bolghar, Bilär | Kingdom | 660 – 1236 AD | Europe: East |
| Duchy of Benevento; After 774, Principality of Benevento | Benevento | Dukedom/Principality/Client | 571 – 1074 AD | Europe: South |
| Kingdom of the Lombards | Pavia | Kingdom | 568 – 774 AD | Europe: South |
| Papal States | Rome | Pontifical states | 754 – 1870 AD | Europe: South |
| San Marino | San Marino | Republic | 301 AD – present | Europe: South |
| Duchy of Tridentum | Benevento | Dukedom/Principality | 574 – 1802 AD | Europe: South |
| Republic of Venice | Venice | Republic | 697 – 1797 AD | Europe: South |
| Armorica | | Kingdom/dukedom | 343 – 1532 AD | Europe: West |
| Kingdom of Asturias | Various | Kingdom | 718 – 924 AD | Europe: West |
| Austrasia | Metz | Kingdom | 511 – 751 AD | Europe: West |
| Bavaria | | Dukedom | 508 – 788 AD | Europe: West |
| Carantania | Karnburg | Principality | 658 – 828 AD | Europe: West |
| Emirate of Córdoba | Córdoba | Principality | 756 – 929 AD | Europe: West |
| Cornouaille | | Principality | 430 – 1084 AD | Europe: West |
| Francia | Tournai, Paris | Kingdom/Empire | 481 – 843 AD | Europe: West |
| Frisian Kingdom | Dorestad, Utrecht | Kingdom | 600 – 734 AD | Europe: West |
| Kingdom of Galicia | Santiago de Compostela | Kingdom | 409 – 1833 AD | Europe: West |
| Old Saxony | | Dukedom | 758 – 804 AD | Europe: West |
| Poher | Vorgium | Principality | 520 – 936 AD | Europe: West |
| Raetia Curiensis | Chur | Bishopric (religious state) | 452 – 1160 AD | Europe: West |
| Saxons (Continental) | | Tribal confederation | 5th century BC – 754 AD | Europe: West |
| Duchy of Thuringia | | Duchy | 631 – 1440 AD | Europe: West |
| Visigothic Kingdom | Various | Kingdom | 418 – 720 AD | Europe: West |
| Arminiya | Dvin | Principality/client | 653 – 884 AD | Eurasian: Caucasus |
| Principality of Iberia | Tbilisi | Principality | 580 – 891 AD | Eurasian: Caucasus |
| Sarir | Humraj | Kingdom/Client | 453 – 12th century AD | Eurasian: Caucasus |
| Ghassanid | Balka, Harith, Petra, Sideir | Kingdom/Client | 220 – 712 AD | Asia: West |
| Afrighids | Kath | Kingdom/Client | 305 – 995 AD | Asia: Central |
| Kingdom of Shule | Kashgar | Kingdom/Client | 80 – 850 AD | Asia: Central |
| Khotan | Khotan | Kingdom | 56 – 1006 AD | Asia: Central |
| Tatar confederation | Not specified | Confederation | 8th century – 1202 AD | Asia: Central |
| Tibetan Empire | Lhasa, Pho brang | Empire | 618 – 907 AD | Asia: Central, East |
| Turgesh Khaganate | Balasagun | Nomadic Empire | 699 – 766 AD | Asia: Central |
| Second Turkic Khaganate | Ordu Baliq | Confederation | 552 – 747 AD | Asia: Central, East |
| Anuradhapura | Anuradhapura | Kingdom | 377 BC – 1017 AD | Asia: South |
| Ay | Aykudi | Kingdom | 4th century BC – 12th century AD | Asia: South |
| Kingdom of Bumthang | Chakhar Gutho | Kingdom | 7th – 17th centuries AD | Asia: South |
| Chera Kingdom | | Kingdom | 5th century BC – 1102 AD | Asia: South |
| Eastern Chalukyas | Vengi, Rajamundry | Kingdom | 624 – 1129 AD | Asia: South |
| Gurjara-Pratihara | Kannauj | Empire | 650 – 1036 AD | Asia: South |
| Kabul Shahi | Kabul, Waihind | Kingdom/Empire | 6th century – 1026 AD | Asia: South |
| Kamarupa | Various | Kingdom | 350 – 1140 AD | Asia: South |
| Maitraka | Vallabhi | Empire | 475 – 767 AD | Asia: South |
| Pallava Empire | Kanchi | Empire | 250 BC – 800 AD | Asia: South |
| Rajarata | Various | Kingdom | 377 BC – 1310 AD | Asia: South |
| Western Ganga dynasty | Kolar, Talakad | Kingdom | 350 – 1000 AD | Asia: South |
| Bruneian Empire | Various | Empire | 7th century – 1888 AD | Asia: Southeast |
| Champa | Various | Kingdom | 192 – 1832 AD | Asia: Southeast |
| Chenla Kingdom | Bhavapura, Isanapura | Kingdom | 550 – 706 AD | Asia: Southeast |
| Gangga Negara | Gangga Negara | Kingdom | 2nd – 11th centuries AD | Asia: Southeast |
| Langkasuka | Kedah, Pattani | Kingdom | 100 – 1516 AD | Asia: Southeast |
| Lavo Kingdom | Lavo, Ayodhaya | Kingdom | 450 – 1388 AD | Asia: Southeast |
| Melayu Kingdom | Jambi | Kingdom | 4th – 13th centuries AD | Asia: Southeast |
| Pyu city-states | Sri Ksetra | Federated City States | 250 BC – 1085 AD | Asia: Southeast |
| Sunda Kingdom | Various | Kingdom | 669 – 1579 AD | Asia: Southeast |
| Thaton Kingdom | Thaton | Kingdom | 300 BC – 1085 AD | Asia: Southeast |
| Tang dynasty | Chang'an, Luoyang | Empire | 618 – 907 AD | Asia: East, Central |
| Khitans | Shangjing | Kingdom/Client | 388 – 1211 AD | Asia: East, China |
| Japan | Various | Empire | 3rd century AD – present | Asia: East, Japan |
| Balhae | Dongmo | Empire | 698 – 926 AD | Asia: East, Korean Peninsula |
| Silla | Gyeongju | Kingdom | 55 BC – 935 AD | Asia: East, Korean Peninsula |
| Usan | | Kingdom | 512 – 930 AD | Asia: East, Korean Peninsula |

== See also ==
- List of Bronze Age states
- List of Iron Age states
- List of Classical Age states
- List of states during Late Antiquity
- List of states during the Middle Ages

List of political entities in the 8th century
| Preceded by 7th century | Political entities of the 8th century | Succeeded by 9th century |
