= List of political entities in the 5th century =

Political entities in the 4th century – Political entities in the 6th century – Political entities by year

This is a list of political entities in the 5th century (401–500) AD.

== Political entities ==
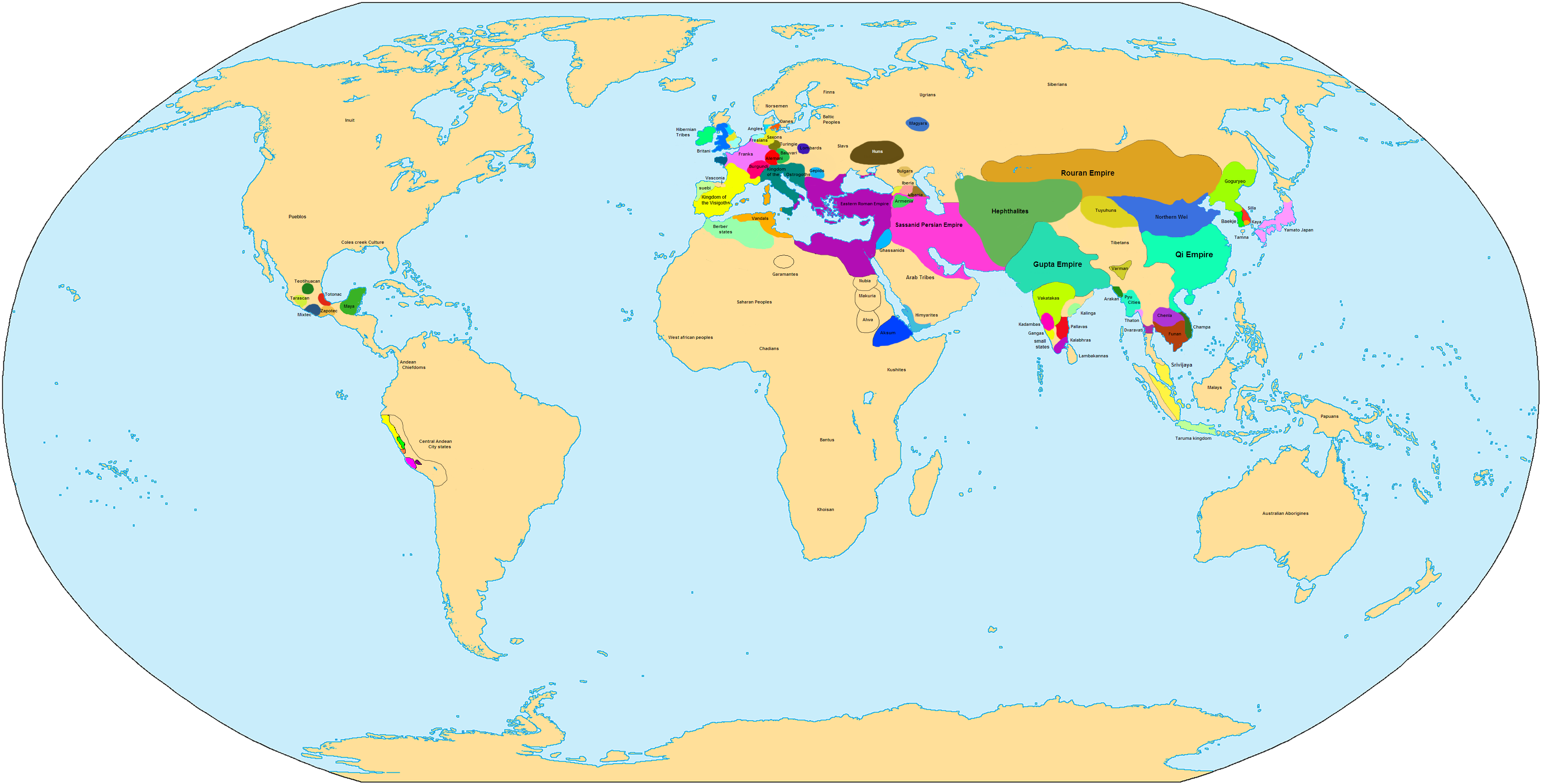
Map of the world in 500 AD

Name	Capital(s)	State type	Existed	Location
Sao civilisation	Various	Tribal city states	6th century BC – 16th century AD	Africa: Central
Garamantes	Garama	Tribal Confederation/Empire	500 BC – 700 AD	Africa: North
Mauro-Roman Kingdom	Altava	Kingdom	477 - 578 AD	Africa: North
Vandal Kingdom	Carthage	Kingdom	435 – 534 AD	Africa: North, Europe: South
Kingdom of Aksum	Aksum	Kingdom	c.100 – c.940 AD	Africa: Northeast
Blemmyes		Tribal Kingdom	600 BC – 8th century AD	Africa: Northeast
Makuria	Dongola	Kingdom	340 – 1312 AD	Africa: Northeast
Nobatia	Pachoras	Kingdom	350 – 650 AD	Africa: Northeast
Gaetulia		Tribal confederation	c. 350 BC – 550 AD	Africa: Northwest
Mauretania	Julia Caesara	Kingdom/Client Kingdom	285 BC – 431 AD	Africa: Northwest
Ghana Empire	Koumbi Saleh	Empire	c. 400 – 1235 AD	Africa: West
Maya	Various	Kingdom City States	2000 BC – 900AD	Americas: Central
Zapotec	Various	Kingdom City States	700 BC – 1521 AD	Americas: Central
Pueblo	Various	Tribal chiefdom's	12th century BC – 14th century AD	Americas: North
Teotihuacan Empire	Teotihuacan	Empire	100 BC – 8th century AD	Americas: North
Moche	Moche-Trujillo.	United Independent Polities	100 – 800 AD	Americas: South
Nazca	Various	Tribal chiefdom's	100 BC – 800 AD	Americas: South
Tiwanaku empire	Tiwanaku	Empire	300 – 1000 AD	Americas: South
Byzantine Empire	Constantinople	Empire	395 – 1453 AD	Europe: Balkans, Asia: West; Africa: Northeast
Gepids	Sirmium	Kingdom	454 – 567 AD	Europe: Balkans
Paeonia		Principality/Kingdom/Client	535 BC – 681 AD	Europe: Balkans
Ailech	Grianán Ailigh	Kingdom	450 – 1283 AD	Europe: British Isles
Airgíalla	Clogher	Tribal Federation/Kingdom	331 – 1590 AD	Europe: British Isles
Bernicia	Bamburgh	Kingdom	420 – 634 AD	Europe: British Isles
Brycheiniog	Talgarth	Kingdom	450 – 1045 AD	Europe: British Isles
Cai		Tribal kingdom	25 – 871 AD	Europe: British Isles
Ce		Tribal kingdom	1st century – 900 AD	Europe: British Isles
Ceredigion		Kingdom	475 – 680 AD	Europe: British Isles
Connacht		Tribal chiefdom/kingdom	c. 10th century BC – 1474 AD	Europe: British Isles
Dumnonia	Isca Dumnoniorum	Dukedom/principality	290 – 875 AD	Europe: British Isles
Dyfed		Kingdom	410 – 910 AD	Europe: British Isles
Fortriu		Tribal kingdom	1 – 850 AD	Europe: British Isles
Glywysing	Cardiff	Kingdom	490 – 1063 AD	Europe: British Isles
Gododdin		Kingdom	5th – 8th century AD	Europe: British Isles
Gwent	Caerwent, Porth-is-Coed	Kingdom	420 – 1081 AD	Europe: British Isles
Gwynedd	Various	Kingdom	420 – 1261 AD	Europe: British Isles
Kent	Durovernum	Kingdom	455 – 871 AD	Europe: British Isles
Leinster		Kingdom	436 – 1632 AD	Europe: British Isles
Lindsey	Lindum	Kingdom/Client	410 – 775 AD	Europe: British Isles
Meath	Dublin	Kingdom	1st century – 1173 AD	Europe: British Isles
Osraige	Kilkenny	Kingdom	150 – 1185 AD	Europe: British Isles
Pictland		Kingdom	250 BC – 850 AD [3]	Europe: British Isles
Powys	Various	Kingdom	488 – 1160 AD	Europe: British Isles
Strathclyde	Dumbarton, Govan	Kingdom	450 – 1093 AD	Europe: British Isles
Sussex	Selsey	Kingdom	477 – 860 AD	Europe: British Isles
Tyrconnell	Dun na nGall	Kingdom	464 – 1607 AD	Europe: British Isles
Ulster		Kingdom	465 – 1177 AD	Europe: British Isles
Bulgars	Balkh/Phanagoria	Tribal confederation	c. 5th century – 7th century AD	Europe: East
Gelonia	Gelonos	Tribal kingdom	5th century BC – 5th century AD	Europe: East
Kutrigurs		Nomadic confederation/client	453 – 8th century AD	Europe: East
Odoacer's Kingdom	Ravenna	Kingdom	476 – 493 AD	Europe: South
Ostrogothic Kingdom	Ravenna	Kingdom	493 – 553 AD	Europe: South
Hunnic Empire		Tribal Empire	470s – 469 AD	Europe: East, West, Central, Balkans
Magyar		Tribal Confederation/Principality	1100 BC – 895 AD	Europe: East
Venedae		Tribal Confederation	400 BC – 7th century AD	Europe: East
San Marino	San Marino	Republic	301 AD – present	Europe: South
Alamannia		Kingdom	213 AD – 496 AD	Europe: West
Armorica		Kingdom/dukedom	343 – 1532 AD	Europe: West
Kingdom of the Burgundians	Borbetomagus, Lugdunum	Kingdom	410 – 534 AD	Europe: West
Cornouaille		Principality	430 – 1084 AD	Europe: West
Franks	Various	Tribal Confederation	210 – 481 AD	Europe: West
Frankish Empire	Tournai, Paris	Kingdom/Empire	481 – 843 AD	Europe: West
Kingdom of Galicia	Santiago de Compostela	Kingdom	409 – 1833 AD	Europe: West
Raetia Curiensis	Chur	Bishopric (religious state)	452 – 1160 AD	Europe: West
Rugiland	Vindobona	Kingdom	467 – 487 AD	Europe: West
Saxons (Continental)		Tribal confederation	5th century BC – 754 AD	Europe: West
Kingdom of Soissons	Noviodunum	Kingdom	457 – 486 AD	Europe: West
Suebi		Tribal Confederation	60 BC – 409 AD	Europe: West
Kingdom of the Suebi	Braga	Kingdom	409 – 585 AD	Europe: West
Vandals		Tribal chiefdoms	2nd century BC – 409 AD	Europe: West
Visigothic Kingdom	Various	Kingdom	418 – 720 AD	Europe: West
Western Roman Empire	Mediolanum, Ravenna	Empire	395 – 476 AD	Europe: South, West, Balkans, British Isles; Africa: North
Caucasian Albania	Kabalak, Partav	Kingdom/Client	65 BC – 628 AD	Eurasian: Caucasus
Iberia	Various	Kingdom	302 BC – 580 AD	Eurasian: Caucasus
Lazica	Phasis	Kingdom/client	1st century BC – 7th century AD	Eurasian: Caucasus
Sarir	Humraj	Kingdom/Client	453 – 12th century AD	Eurasian: Caucasus
Armenia	Van	Kingdom	553 BC – 428AD	Asia: West
Carmania		Kingdom/client	600 BC – 651 AD	Asia: West
Corduene		Principality/kingdom/client	800 BC – 653 AD	Asia: West
Gardman	Parisos	Principality/Kingdom/Client	66 – 428 AD	Asia: West
Ghassanid	Balka, Harith, Petra, Sideir	Kingdom/Client	220 – 712 AD	Asia: West
Himyarite Kingdom	Zafar	Kingdom	110 BC–570 AD	Asia: West
Kindah	Qaryat Dhāt Kāhil	Tribal kingdom	2nd century BC – 525 AD	Asia: West
Lakhmids	Al-Hirah	Kingdom	300 – 602 AD	Asia: West
Sasanian Persian Empire	Estakhr, Ctesiphon	Empire	224 – 637 AD	Asia: West, South
Zabdicene		Principality/client	780 BC – 5th century AD	Asia: West
Afrighids	Kath	Kingdom/Client	305 – 995 AD	Asia: Central
Fergana	Khokand	Kingdom	220 BC – 590 AD	Asia: Central
Hephthalite Empire	Various	Empire	408 – 670 AD	Asia: Central
Kangju		Tribal Federation	280 BC – 585 AD	Asia: Central
Kingdom of Shule	Kashgar	Kingdom/Client	80 – 850 AD	Asia: Central
Khotan	Khotan	Kingdom	56 – 1006 AD	Asia: Central
Kucha	Kucha	Buddhist Kingdom	46 – 658 AD	Asia: Central
Rouran Khaganate		Confederation	330 – 555 AD	Asia: Central, East
Sumpa		Tribal chiefdom/client	1600 BC – 7th century AD	Asia: Central
Turpan	Turpan	Buddhist Kingdom	480 – 640 AD	Asia: Central
Tuyuhun	Fuqi	Nomadic Kingdom	285 – 670 AD	Asia: Central
Xionites		Tribal federation	320 – late 5th century AD	Asia: Central
Anuradhapura	Anuradhapura	Kingdom	377 BC – 1017 AD	Asia: South
Ay	Aykudi	Kingdom	4th century BC – 12th century AD	Asia: South
Chera Kingdom		Kingdom	5th century BC – 1102 AD	Asia: South
Gupta Empire	Pataliputra	Empire	320 – 620 AD	Asia: South
Kamarupa	Various	Kingdom	350 – 1140 AD	Asia: South
Maitraka	Vallabhi	Empire	475 – 767 AD	Asia: South
Pallava Empire	Kanchi	Empire	250 BC – 800 AD	Asia: South
Pundra	Pundravardhana	Kingdom	1300 BC – 550 AD	Asia: South
Rai dynasty	Aror	Empire	489 – 690 AD	Asia: South
Rajarata	Various	Kingdom	377 BC – 1310 AD	Asia: South
Ruhuna	Magama	Principality	200 BC – 450 AD	Asia: South
Satavahana Empire	Vatsagulma	Empire	250 – 500 AD	Asia: South
Vanga	Gange	Kingdom	1300 BC – 580 AD	Asia: South
Vishnukundina	Indrapalanagara	Empire	420 – 624 AD	Asia: South
Western Ganga dynasty	Kolar, Talakad	Kingdom	350 – 1000 AD	Asia: South
Western Satraps	Ozone, Barygaza	Kingdom	35 – 405 AD	Asia: South
Champa	Various	Kingdom	192 – 1832 AD	Asia: Southeast
Chi Tu		Kingdom	100 BC – 7th century AD	Asia: Southeast
Funan	Various	Kingdom	60 – 550 AD	Asia: Southeast
Gangga Negara	Gangga Negara	Kingdom	2nd – 11th centuries AD	Asia: Southeast
Langkasuka	Kedah, Pattani	Kingdom	100 – 1516 AD	Asia: Southeast
Lavo Kingdom	Lavo, Ayodhaya	Kingdom	450 – 1388 AD	Asia: Southeast
Melayu Kingdom	Jambi	Kingdom	4th – 13th centuries AD	Asia: Southeast
Pyu city-states	Sri Ksetra	Federated City States	250 BC – 1085 AD	Asia: Southeast
Tarumanagara	Sundapura	Kingdom	358 – 669 AD	Asia: Southeast
Thaton Kingdom	Thaton	Kingdom	300 BC – 1085 AD	Asia: Southeast
Chouchi	Lüeyang	Principality	184 – 511 AD	Asia: East, China
Khitans	Shangjing	Kingdom/Client	388 – 1211 AD	Asia: East, China
Liu Song dynasty	Jiankang	Empire	420 – 479 AD	Asia: East, China
Northern Liang	Jiankang	Kingdom/Client	397 – 460 AD	Asia: East, China
Northern Wei	Shengle	Empire	386 – 585 AD	Asia: East, China
Southern Qi	Jiankang	Kingdom	477 – 502 AD	Asia: East, China
Western Qin	Yongshicheng	Kingdom	385 – 431 AD	Asia: East, China
Yamato	Various	Kingdom	3rd century AD – present	Asia: East, Japan
Baekje	Various	Kingdom	18 BC – 660 AD	Asia: East, Korean Peninsula
Buyeo	Buyeoseong	Kingdom	189 BC – 494 AD	Asia: East, Korean Peninsula
Dongye		Chiefdom	3rd century BC – 5th century AD	Asia: East, Korean Peninsula
Gaya confederacy	Gaya	Confederacy	42 – 562 AD	Asia: East, Korean Peninsula
Goguryeo	Various	Kingdom	37 BC – 668 AD	Asia: East, Korean Peninsula
Okjeo		Tribal state	2nd century BC – 5th century AD	Asia: East, Korean Peninsula
Siljik		Kingdom	102 – 6th century AD	Asia: East, Korean Peninsula
Silla	Gyeongju	Kingdom	55 BC – 935 AD	Asia: East, Korean Peninsula

== See also ==
- List of Bronze Age states
- List of Iron Age states
- List of Classical Age states
- List of states during Late Antiquity
- List of states during the Middle Ages

List of political entities in the 5th century
Preceded by 4th century	Political entities of the 5th century	Succeeded by 6th century
