= List of states during Late Antiquity =

Late Antiquity is a historiographical term for the historical period from c. 200 AD to c. 700 AD, which marks the transition from Classical Antiquity to the Middle Ages. Precise boundaries for the period are a matter of debate, but historian Peter Brown proposed a period between the 2nd and 8th centuries. While generally, it can be thought of as from the end of the Roman Empire's Crisis of the Third Century (c. 235–284) to the re-organization of the Eastern Roman Empire under Heraclius and the Muslim conquests in the mid-7th century, for the purposes of this page it will be considered the period 200 to 700 AD.

This list's the main types state that existed in Africa, Americas, Central Asia, East Asia, Europe, Eurasian Steppe, South Asia, and West Asia.

== Political entities ==
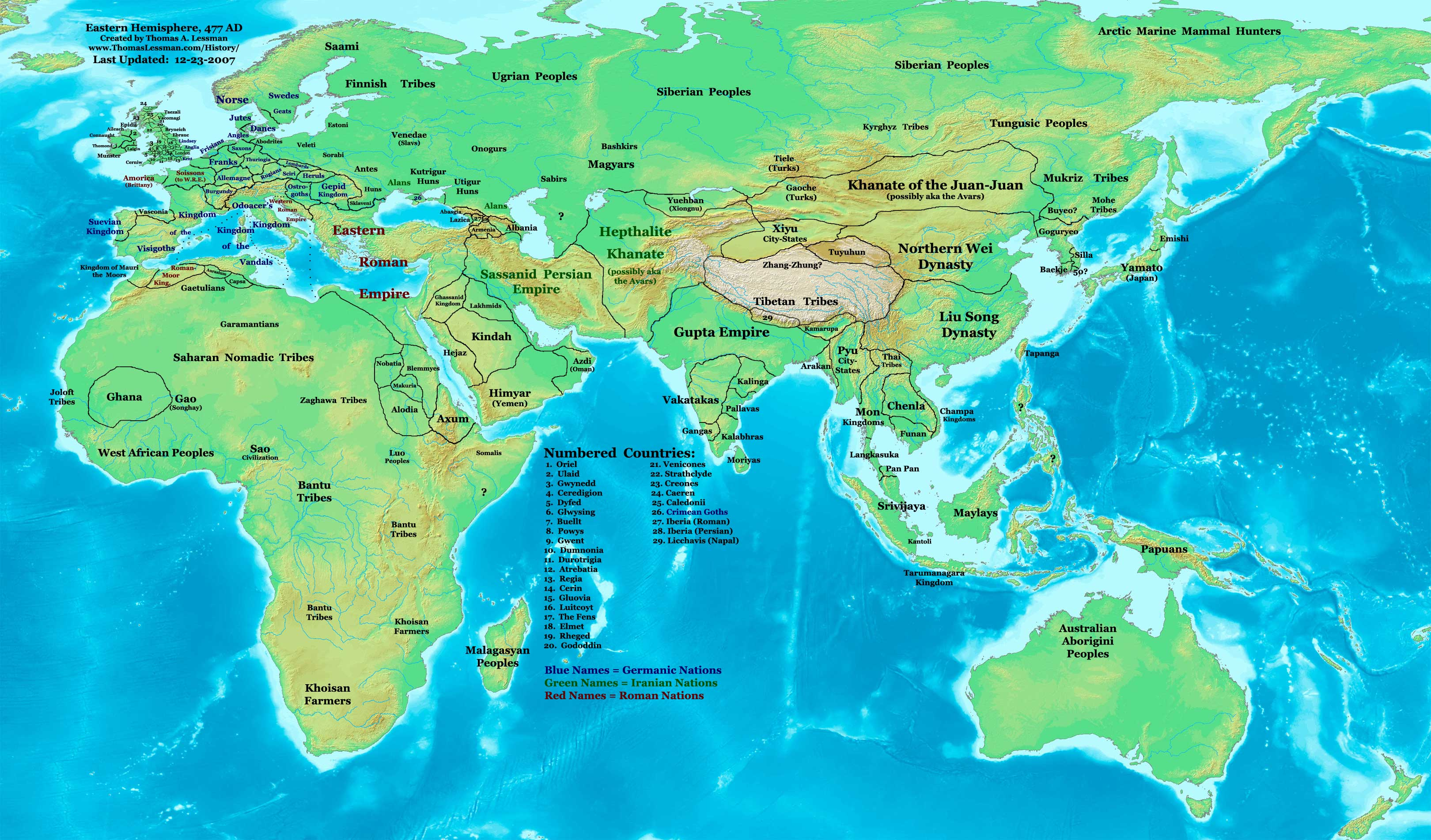
Map of the Old World in 477 AD

Location	Name	Capital(s)	State type	From	To
Central Africa	Sao civilisation	various	tribal city states	6th cent. BC	16th cent. AD
Northern Africa	Garamantes	Garama	tribal confederation/empire	500 BC	700 AD
Northern Africa; West Asia; Western Europe	Umayyad Caliphate	Damascus, Harran	empire	661	750
Northern Africa, Southern Europe	Vandal Kingdom	Carthage	kingdom	435	534
Northeast Africa	Aksum	Aksum	kingdom	c.100	c. 940
Northeast Africa	Alodia	Soba	empire	680	1504
Northeast Africa	Blemmyes		tribal kingdom	600 BC	8th cent. AD
Northeast Africa	Makuria	Dongola	kingdom	340	1312
Northeast Africa	Nobatia	Pachoras	kingdom	350	650
Northwest Africa	Gaetulia		tribal confederation	c. 350 BC	550 AD
Northwest Africa	Garmul	Altava	kingdom	530	578
Northwest Africa	Ouarsenis	Jedars	kingdom	430	735
West Africa	Ghana Empire	Koumbi Saleh	empire	c. 400	1235
Central America	Maya	various	kingdom city states	2000 BC	900 AD
Central America	Zapotec	various	kingdom city states	700 BC	1521 AD
North America	Cholula	Cholula	city-state	600 BC	700 AD
North America	Pueblo	various	tribal chiefdom's	12th cent. BC	14th cent. AD
North America	Teotihuacan Empire	Teotihuacan	empire	100 BC	8th cent. AD
North America	Teuchitlán		various chiefdoms	350 BC	450/500 AD
South America	Lima	Lima	kingdom	100	650
South America	Moche	Moche-Trujillo	united independent polities	100	800
South America	Nazca	various	tribal chiefdom's	100 BC	800 AD
South America	Tiwanaku empire	Tiwanaku	empire	300	1000
South America	Wari Empire	Huari	empire	500	1100
Balkans	Avar Khaganate		khaganate	567	804
Balkans, West Asia; Northeast Africa	Byzantine Empire	Constantinople	empire	395	1453
Balkans	Gepids	Sirmium	kingdom	454	567
British Isles	Ailech	Grianán Ailigh	kingdom	450	1283
British Isles	Airgíalla	Clogher	tribal federation/kingdom	331	1590
British Isles	Bernicia	Bamburgh	kingdom	420	634
British Isles	Brycheiniog	Talgarth	kingdom	450	1045
British Isles	Cai		tribal kingdom	25	871
British Isles	Ce		tribal kingdom	1st cent.	900
British Isles	Ceredigion		kingdom	475	680
British Isles	Connacht		tribal chiefdom/kingdom	c. 10th cent. BC	1474 AD
British Isles	Dál Riata	Dunadd	kingdom	501	878
British Isles	Deira	York	kingdom	559	664
British Isles	Dumnonia	Isca Dumnoniorum	dukedom/principality	290	875
British Isles	Dyfed		kingdom	410	910
British Isles	East Anglia	Rendlesham, Dommoc	kingdom	6th cent.	918
British Isles	East Anglia	Rendlesham, Dommoc	kingdom	512	927
British Isles	Elmet	Loidis	kingdom	4th cent.	7th cent.
British Isles	Ergyng		kingdom	5th cent.	7th cent.
British Isles	Essex		kingdom	527	825
British Isles	Fortriu		tribal kingdom	1	850
British Isles	Glywysing	Cardiff	kingdom	490	1063
British Isles	Gododdin		kingdom	5th cent.	8th cent.
British Isles	Gwent	Caerwent, Porth-is-Coed	kingdom	420	1081
British Isles	Gwynedd	various	kingdom	420	1261
British Isles	Haestingas	Hastings	tribal kingdom	6th cent.	771
British Isles	Hwicce	Worcester	kingdom	577	780s
British Isles	Kent	Durovernum	kingdom	455	871
British Isles	Leinster		kingdom	436	1632
British Isles	Lindsey	Lindum	kingdom/client	410	775
British Isles	Meath	Dublin	kingdom	1st cent.	1173
British Isles	Mercia	Tamworth	kingdom	527	918
British Isles	Northumbria	Bamburgh	kingdom	653	954
British Isles	Osraige	Kilkenny	kingdom	150	1185
British Isles	Pictland		kingdom	250 BC	850 AD
British Isles	Powys	various	kingdom	488	1160
British Isles	Rheged		kingdom	550	650
British Isles	Seisyllwg		kingdom	680	920
British Isles	Strathclyde	Dumbarton, Govan	kingdom	450	1093
British Isles	Sussex	Selsey	kingdom	477	860
British Isles	Tyrconnell	Dun na nGall	kingdom	464	1607
British Isles	Wessex	Winchester	kingdom	519	1018
British Isles	Wihtwara	Wihtgarsburgh	kingdom	512	927
Eastern Europe	Samo's Empire	Morava	empire	631	648
Eastern Europe, Western Europe, Central Europe, Balkans	Hunnic Empire		tribal empire	370s	469
Eastern Europe, Central Asia	Huns		nomadic confederation	1st cent.	370
Eastern Europe, Caucasus, Central Asia	Khazar Khaganate	various	nomadic kingdom	618	1048
Eastern Europe	Kutrigurs		nomadic confederation/client	453	8th cent.
Eastern Europe	Old Great Bulgaria	Phanagoria	kingdom	632	668
Eastern Europe	Venedae		tribal confederation	400 BC	7th cent. AD
Eastern Europe	Volga Bulgaria	Bolghar, Bilär	kingdom	660	1236
Southern Europe	Duchy of Benevento after 774, Principality of Benevento	Benevento	dukedom/principality/client	571	1074
Southern Europe	Kingdom of the Lombards	Pavia	kingdom	568	774
Southern Europe	Odoacer's Kingdom	Ravenna	kingdom	476	493
Southern Europe	Ostrogothic Kingdom	Ravenna	kingdom	493	553
Southern Europe, Western Europe, Balkans, British Isles; Northern Africa; West Asia	Roman Empire	Rome, Constantinople	empire	27 BC	1453 AD
Southern Europe	San Marino	San Marino	republic	301	present
Southern Europe	Duchy of Tridentum	Benevento	dukedom/principality	574	1802
Western Europe	Alamannia		kingdom	213	496
Western Europe	Alemanni		tribal confederation	85 BC	213 AD
Western Europe	Armorica		kingdom/dukedom	343	1532
Western Europe	Austrasia	Metz	kingdom	511	751
Western Europe	Bavaria		dukedom	508	788
Western Europe	Kingdom of the Burgundians	Borbetomagus, Lugdunum	kingdom	410	534
Western Europe	Carantania	Karnburg	principality	658	828
Western Europe	Cornouaille		principality	430	1084
Western Europe	Francia	Tournai, Paris	kingdom/empire	481	843
Western Europe	Franks	various	tribal confederation	210	481
Western Europe	Frisian Kingdom	Dorestad, Utrecht	kingdom	600	734
Western Europe	Galicia	Santiago de Compostela	kingdom	409	1833
Western Europe	Poher	Vorgium	principality	520	936
Western Europe	Raetia Curiensis	Chur	bishopric (religious state)	452	1160
Western Europe	Rugiland	Vindobona	kingdom	467	487
Western Europe	Saxons (Continental)		tribal confederation	5th cent. BC	754 AD
Western Europe	Kingdom of Soissons	Noviodunum	kingdom	457	486
Western Europe	Suebi		tribal confederation	60 BC	409 AD
Western Europe	Kingdom of the Suebi	Braga	kingdom	409	585
Western Europe	Visigothic Kingdom	various	kingdom	418	720
Southern Europe, Western Europe, British Isles; Northern Africa	Western Roman Empire	Mediolanum, Ravenna	empire	395	476
Caucasus	Arminiya	Dvin	principality/client	653	884
Caucasus	Caspiane		tribal kingdom/client	650 BC	387 AD
Caucasus	Caucasian Albania	Kabalak, Partav	kingdom/client	65 BC	628 AD
Caucasus	Iberia	various	kingdom	302 BC	580 AD
Caucasus	Principality of Iberia	Tbilisi	principality	580	891
Caucasus	Lazica	Phasis	kingdom/client	1st cent. BC	7th cent. AD
Caucasus	Sarir	Humraj	kingdom/client	453	12th cent.
West Asia	Adiabene	Arbela	kingdom/client	15	379
West Asia	Armenia	Van	kingdom	553 BC	428 AD
West Asia	Corduene		principality/kingdom/client	800 BC	653 AD
West Asia	Ghassanid	Balka, Harith, Petra, Sideir	kingdom/client	220	712
West Asia	Kindah	Qaryat Dhāt Kāhil	tribal kingdom	2nd cent. BC	525 AD
West Asia	Lakhmids	Al-Hirah	kingdom	300	602
West Asia; Northeast Africa	Rashidun Caliphate	Medina, Kuffa	empire	632	661
West Asia, Central Asia, Caucasus	Sasanian Empire	Estakhr, Ctesiphon	empire	224	637
West Asia	Zabdicene		principality/client	780 BC	5th cent. AD
Central Asia	Afrighids	Kath	kingdom/client	305	995
Central Asia	Alchon Huns	Kapisa	kingdom	370	670
Central Asia	Fergana	Khokand	kingdom	220 BC	590 AD
Central Asia	Hephthalite Empire	various	empire	408	670
Central Asia	Kangju		tribal federation	280 BC	585 AD
Central Asia	Kidarites	Bactria, Peshawar, Taxila	kingdom	320	467
Central Asia	Khotan	Khotan	kingdom	56	1006
Central Asia	Kucha	Kucha	buddhist kingdom	46	658
Central Asia	Nezak Huns	Ghazna, Kapisa	kingdom	484	665
Central Asia	Patola Shahis	Gilgit	buddhist kingdom	6th cent.	8th cent.
Central Asia	Shanshan		kingdom	92 BC	445 AD
Central Asia	Shule Kingdom	Kashgar	kingdom	200 BC	790 AD
Central Asia, East Asia	Rouran Khaganate		confederation	330	555
Central Asia	Sumpa		tribal chiefdom/client	1600 BC	7th cent. AD
East Asia, Central Asia	Tang dynasty	Chang'an, Luoyang	empire	618	907
Central Asia, East Asia	Tibetan Empire	Lhasa, Pho brang	empire	618	907
Central Asia	Turgesh Khaganate	Balasagun	nomadic empire	699	766
Central Asia, East Asia	First Turkic Khaganate	Ordu Baliq	confederation	552	747
Central Asia	Turpan	Turpan	buddhist kingdom	480	640
Central Asia	Tuyuhun	Fuqi	nomadic kingdom	285	670
Central Asia	Xionites		tribal federation	320	late 5th cent.
East Africa, Central Africa	Yueban		tribal confederation	160	490
South Asia	Andhra Ikshvaku	Vijayapuri	kingdom	3rd cent.	4th cent.
South Asia	Aulikara dynasty	Mandsaur	kingdom	4th cent.	550
South Asia	Ay	Aykudi	kingdom	4th cent. BC	12th cent. AD
South Asia	Bumthang	Chakhar Gutho	kingdom	7th cent.	17th cent.
South Asia	Chalukya dynasty	Badami	kingdom	543	753
South Asia	Chera Kingdom		kingdom	5th cent. BC	1102 AD
South Asia	Davaka kingdom	Lanka	kingdom	?	6th cent.
South Asia	Eastern Chalukyas	Vengi, Rajamundry	kingdom	624	1129
South Asia	Eastern Ganga dynasty	various	kingdom	493	1947
South Asia	Gauda Kingdom	Karnasuvarna	kingdom	590	626
South Asia	Gupta Empire	Pataliputra	empire	320	620
South Asia	Gurjara-Pratihara	Kannauj	empire	650	1036
South Asia	Harsha	Kanauj	empire	606	647
South Asia	Kabul Shahi	Kabul, Waihind	kingdom/empire	6th cent.	1026
South Asia	Kadamba dynasty	Banavasi	kingdom	345	540
South Asia	Kamarupa	various	kingdom	350	1140
South Asia	Maitraka	Vallabhi	empire	475	767
South Asia	Maukhari	Kannauj	empire	550s	8th cent.
South Asia	Mushika	Ezhimalai	kingdom	3rd cent. BC	4th cent. AD
South Asia	Nala dynasty	Pushkari	kingdom	6th cent.	6th cent.
South Asia	Pallava Empire	Kanchi	empire	250 BC	800 AD
South Asia	Pundra	Pundravardhana	kingdom	1300 BC	550 AD
South Asia	Rai dynasty	Aror	empire	489	690
South Asia	Rajarata	various	kingdom	377 BC	1310 AD
South Asia	Ruhuna	Magama	principality	200 BC	450 AD
South Asia	Sharabhapuriya dynasty	Sharabhapura	kingdom	5th cent.	6th cent.
South Asia	Taank Kingdom	Shekilo	kingdom	550	700
South Asia	Traikutaka dynasty		kingdom	388	456
South Asia	Vakataka Empire	Amaravati	empire	230 BC	230 AD
South Asia	Varman dynasty	Kannauj	kingdom	725	770
South Asia	Vishnukundina	Indrapalanagara	empire	420	624
South Asia	Western Ganga dynasty	Kolar, Talakad	kingdom	350	1000
South Asia	Western Satraps	Ozone, Barygaza	kingdom	35	405
Southeast Asia	Champa	various	kingdom	192	1832
Southeast Asia	Chenla Kingdom	Bhavapura, Isanapura	kingdom	550	706
Southeast Asia	Chi Tu		kingdom	100 BC	7th cent. AD
Southeast Asia	Funan	various	kingdom	60	550
Southeast Asia	Gangga Negara	Gangga Negara	kingdom	2nd cent.	11th cent.
Southeast Asia	Langkasuka	Kedah, Pattani	kingdom	100	1516
Southeast Asia	Lavo Kingdom	Lavo, Ayodhaya	kingdom	450	1388
Southeast Asia	Melayu Kingdom	Jambi	kingdom	4th cent.	13th cent.
Southeast Asia	Pyu city-states	Sri Ksetra	federated city states	250 BC	1085 AD
Southeast Asia	Samaskuta Kingdom		kingdom	?	416
Southeast Asia	Tarumanagara	Sundapura	kingdom	358	669
Southeast Asia	Thaton Kingdom	Thaton	kingdom	300 BC	1085 AD
Southeast Asia, Vietnam	Vạn Xuân	Longbian	kingdom	544	602
East Asia, China	Cao Wei	various	kingdom	220	265
East Asia, China	Chen dynasty	Jiankang	kingdom	557	589
East Asia, China	Cheng Han	Chengdu	kingdom	304	347
East Asia, China	Chouchi	Lüeyang	principality	184	511
East Asia, China	Duan		tribal chiefdom/dukedom	250	338
East Asia, China	Eastern Wei	Luoyang, Yecheng	kingdom	534	550
East Asia, China	Eastern Wu	Wuchang, Jianye	kingdom	229	280
East Asia, China	Former Zhao	Lishi	kingdom	304	329
East Asia, China	Jin	Luoyang	empire	266	420
East Asia, China	Khitans	Shangjing	kingdom/client	388	1211
East Asia, China	Liang dynasty	Jiankang, Jiangling	kingdom	502	557
East Asia, China	Liu Song dynasty	Jiankang	empire	420	479
East Asia, China	Mu'ege	Mugebaizhage	chiefdom	300	1698
East Asia, China	Northern Liang	Jiankang	kingdom/client	397	460
East Asia, China	Northern Qi	Yecheng	kingdom	550	577
East Asia, China	Northern Wei	Shengle	empire	386	585
East Asia, China	Northern Zhou	Chang'an	kingdom	557	581
East Asia, China	Shu Han	Chengdu	kingdom	221	263
East Asia, China	Southern Qi	Jiankang	kingdom	477	502
East Asia, China	Sui dynasty	Dazing, later Luoyang	kingdom	581	618
East Asia, China	Western Liang	Jingzhou	kingdom	555	587
East Asia, China	Western Qin	Yongshicheng	kingdom	385	431
East Asia, China	Western Wei	Chang'an	kingdom	535	557
East Asia, Japan	Japan	various	empire	660 BC	present
East Asia, Korean Peninsula	Baekje	various	kingdom	18 BC	660 AD
East Asia, Korean Peninsula	Balhae	Dongmo	empire	698	926
East Asia, Korean Peninsula	Buyeo	Buyeoseong	kingdom	189 BC	494 AD
East Asia, Korean Peninsula	Dongye		chiefdom	3rd cent. BC	5th cent. AD
East Asia, Korean Peninsula	Gaya confederacy	Gaya	confederation	42	562
East Asia, Korean Peninsula	Goguryeo	various	kingdom	37 BC	668 AD
East Asia, Korean Peninsula	Mahan confederacy	Cheonan	confederation	98 BC	250 AD
East Asia, Korean Peninsula	Okjeo		tribal state	2nd cent. BC	5th cent. AD
East Asia, Korean Peninsula	Samhan		confederation	1st cent. BC	4th cent. AD
East Asia, Korean Peninsula	Siljik		kingdom	102	6th cent.
East Asia, Korean Peninsula	Silla	Gyeongju	kingdom	55 BC	935 AD
East Asia, Korean Peninsula	Usan		kingdom	512	930

== See also ==
- List of Copper Age states (c. 5000–3300 BC)
- List of Bronze Age states (c. 3300–1200 BC)
- List of Iron Age states (c. 1200–600 BC)
- List of Classical Age states (c. 600 BC–200 AD)
- List of states during the Middle Ages (c. 700–1500)
- List of former sovereign states
- List of political entities in the 3rd century
- List of political entities in the 4th century
- List of political entities in the 5th century
- List of political entities in the 6th century
- List of political entities in the 7th century
- List of ancient great powers
- List of medieval great powers
- List of modern great powers
- List of largest empires
- Lists of state leaders by year
- History of Africa
- Ancient Americas
- History of Central Asia
- Ancient China
- History of East Asia
- History of Europe
- History of India
- Ancient Iran
- Ancient Middle East
- Ancient Near East
- History of South Asia
