= Realm =

Community or territory

A realm is a community or territory over which a sovereign rules.

== See also ==
- Biogeographic realm, a concept in biogeography
- Demesne (or "Domain"), the term for the part of the realm controlled directly rather than via tenants.
- Empire
- Kingdom
- Reich, the German word for "realm"
