= Siljik =

Ancient Korean protostate

- Hangul: 실직
- Hanja: 悉直
- RR: Siljik
- MR: Silchik

Siljik (Korean: 실직) was the name of first an independent kingdom (Siljik-guk) and then a province of Silla (Siljik-gun). It was located near present-day Samcheok, in Gangwon Province, South Korea.

First appearing in historical records in 102, Siljik was at that time an independent state strong enough to contest for territory with far off Eumjipbeol-guk in present-day Gyeongsan. Later, it was absorbed into Silla, permanently losing its independence no later than the early 6th century.

Siljik stood on the border between Goguryeo and Silla spheres of influence in the early Three Kingdoms period, making it of great strategic interest to both countries. For a time in the 6th century, it was overseen by noted Silla general Yi Sabu.

It is sometimes asserted that Siljik was a member of the Byeonhan confederacy, but its name does not appear in any recognizable form in the San guo zhi's list of Byeonhan tribes.

Only one Siljik ruler's name has come down to the present day, that of King Anil, after whom a mountain fortress in Uljin is named. In addition, the title of "King of Siljik" was revived by Taejo at the beginning of the Goryeo dynasty. He bestowed this title on Kim Wi-ong, a scion of the Silla royal house. Kim's tomb remains in Samcheok today.

== See also ==
- History of Korea
- Samhan
- Proto–Three Kingdoms of Korea
