= Vistula Veneti =

Historic Slavs near Gdańsk bay

The Vistula Veneti, also called Baltic Veneti, Venedi or Venethi, were an Indo-European people that inhabited the lands of central Europe east of the Vistula River and the Bay of Gdańsk. Ancient Roman geographers first mentioned Venedi in the 1st century AD, differentiating a group of peoples whose manner and language differed from those of the neighbouring Germanic and Sarmatian tribes. In the 6th century AD, Byzantine historians described the Veneti as the ancestors of the Slavs who, during the second phase of the Migration Period, crossed the northern frontiers of the Byzantine Empire.

== Roman historical sources ==
The Roman Empire under Hadrian (117–138 AD), showing the location of the Veneti (Venedi) east of the upper Vistula region (south-eastern Poland and western Ukraine).

Pliny the Elder places the Veneti along the Baltic coast. He calls them the Sarmatian Venedi (Latin: Sarmatae Venedi). Thereafter, the 2nd century Greco-Roman geographer Ptolemy in his section on Sarmatia, places the Greater Ouenedai along the entire Venedic Bay, which is equivalent to the southern shores of the Baltic. He names tribes south of the Greater Venedae along the eastern bank of the Vistula and further east.

The most exhaustive Roman treatment of the Veneti comes in Germania by Tacitus, who writing in AD 98, places the Veneti among the peoples on the eastern fringe of Germania. He was uncertain of their ethnic identity, classifying them as Germanic based on their way of life, but not based on their language (in comparison to, for example, the Peucini):

Here Suebia ends. I do not know whether to class the tribes of the Peucini, Venedi, and Fenni with the Germans or with the Sarmatians. The Peucini, however, who are sometimes called Bastarnae, are like Germans in their language, manner of life, and mode of settlement and habitation. Squalor is universal among them and their nobles are indolent. Mixed marriages are giving them something of the repulsive appearance of the Sarmatians. The Venedi have adopted many Sarmatian habits; for their plundering forays take them over all the wooded and mountainous highlands that lie between the Peucini and the Fenni. Nevertheless, they are on the whole to be classed as Germans; for they have settled homes, carry shields, and are fond of travelling—and travelling fast on foot—differing in all these respects from the Sarmatians, who live in wagons or on horseback. The Fenni are astonishingly savage and disgustingly poor.

== Byzantine historical sources ==
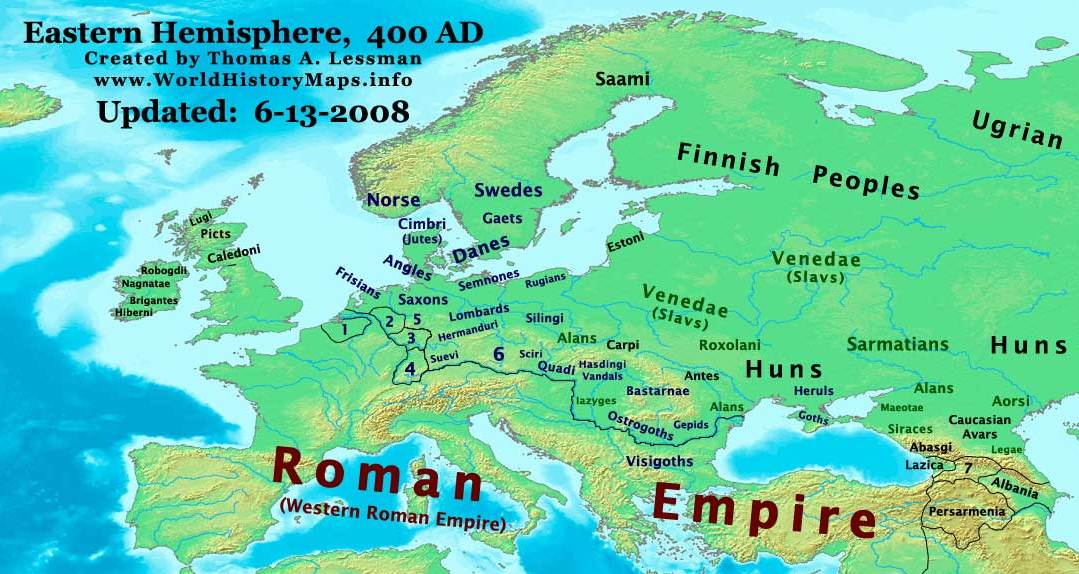
Map of the Western and Eastern Roman empire in the end of the 4th century AD, identifying the location of the Venedae (Veneti) in central and eastern Europe.

Among the Byzantine authors, the Gothic author Jordanes in his work Getica (written in 550 or 551 AD) describes the Veneti as a "populous nation" whose dwellings begin at the sources of the Vistula and occupy "a great expanse of land". He describes them as the ancestors of the Sclaveni (a people who appeared on the Byzantine frontier in the early 6th century and who were the early South Slavs) and of the Antes (East Slavs). Specifically, he states that the Sclaveni and the Antes used to be called the Veneti, but are now "chiefly" (though, by implication, not exclusively) called Sclaveni and Antes. He places the Sclaveni north of a line from the Dniestr to Lake Musianus, the location of which is unclear, but which has been variously identified with Lake Constance, the Tisa–Danube marshes or the Danube delta. He also places the Antes to the east of the Sclaveni.

Later in Getica, he returns to the Veneti by stating that though "off-shoots of one stock [these people] have now three names, that is Veneti, Antes and Sclaveni" and noting that they, at one time, had been conquered by the Goths under Ermanaric. Consistent with the view that the Veneti were an umbrella term for these three peoples, he later also recalls the defeat of the Antes at the hands of a Gothic chieftain named Vinitharius, i.e., conqueror of the Veneti.

Though Jordanes is the only author to explicitly associate the Veneti with the Sclaveni and Antes, the Tabula Peutingeriana, originating from the 3rd to the 4th century AD, separately mentions the Venedi on the northern bank of the Danube somewhat upstream of its mouth and the Venadi Sarmatae along the Baltic coast.

== Archaeology ==
In the region identified by Ptolemy and Pliny, east of the Vistula and adjoining the Baltic, there was an Iron Age culture known to archaeologists as the West Baltic Cairns Culture or West Baltic Barrow Culture, and the Przeworsk and Zarubintsy cultures east of the Vistula river. The Baltic cultures are associated with the Proto-Balts. These herders lived in small settlements or in little lake dwellings built on artificial islands made of several layers of wooden logs attached by stakes. Their metals were imported, and their dead were cremated and put in urns covered by small mounds. The Przeworsk and Zarubintsy cultures are associated with Proto-Slavs, though the Przeworsk culture was a mix of several tribal societies and is also often linked to the Germanic tribe of Vandals.

== Ethnolinguistic character ==
During the Middle Ages the region east of the mouth of the Vistula river was inhabited by people speaking Old Prussian, a now-extinct Baltic language in an area described by Tacitus in AD 98 as "Suebian Sea, which washes the country of the Aestii, who have the same customs and fashions as the Suebi". It is unknown what language the yet further east Veneti spoke, although the implication of Tacitus' description of them is that it was not a form of Germanic.

=== Proto-Slavic and Baltic languages ===
Linguists agree that Slavic languages evolved in close proximity with the Baltic languages. The two language families probably evolved from a common ancestor, a phylogenetic Proto-Balto/Slavic language continuum. The earliest origins of Slavs seem to lie in the area between the Middle Dnieper and the Bug rivers, where the most archaic Slavic hydronyms have been established. The vocabulary of Proto-Slavic had a heterogenous character and there is evidence that in the early stages of its evolution it adopted some loanwords from centum-type Indo-European languages. It has been proposed that contacts of Proto-Slavs with the Veneti may have been one of the sources for these borrowings. The aforementioned area of proto-Slavic hydronyms roughly corresponds with the Zarubintsy archaeological culture which has been interpreted as the most likely locus of the ethnogenesis of Slavs. According to Polish archaeologist Michał Parczewski, Slavs began to settle in southeastern Poland no earlier than the late 5th century AD, the Prague culture being their recognizable expression.

== Historic references to the Early Slavs ==
Modern historians most often link the Veneti to Early Slavs, based on Jordanes' writings from the 6th century:

The Slavs, an eastern branch of the Indo-European family, were known to the Roman and Greek writers of the 1st and 2d centuries A.D. under the name of Venedi as inhabiting the region beyond the Vistula... In the course of the early centuries of our era the Slavs expanded in all directions, and by the 6th century, when they were known to Gothic and Byzantine writers as Sclaveni, they were apparently already separated into three main divisions...

— An Encyclopedia of World History, William L. Langer, Harvard University, 1940 & 1948

It is also clear that the Franks in later centuries (see, e.g., Life of Saint Martinus, Fredegar's Chronicle, Gregory of Tours), Lombards (see, e.g., Paul the Deacon), and Anglo-Saxons (see Widsith's Song) referred to Slavs both in the Elbe-Saal region and in Pomerania generally, as Wenden or Winden (see Wends), which was a later corruption of the word Veneti. Likewise, the Franks and Bavarians of Styria and Carinthia referred to their Slavic neighbours as Windische. A term still used sparsely today as en exonym for the Slovenes and sometimes also as an endonym by the Carinthian Slovenes.

It has not been shown that either the original Veneti or the Slavs themselves used the ethnonym Veneti to describe their ethnos. Of course, other peoples, e.g. the Germans (called so first by the Romans), did not have a name for themselves other than localized tribal names.

== Controversies ==
Roland Steinacher states that "The name Veneder was introduced by Jordanes. The assumption that these were Slavs can be traced back to the 19th century to Pavel Josef Šafařík from Prague, who tried to establish a Slavic Origin. Scholars and historians since then viewed the reports on Venedi/Venethi by Tacitus, Pliny and Ptolemy as the earliest historical attestation of Slavs. "Such conceptions, started in the 16th century, resurfaced in the 19th century where they provided the basis for interpretations of the history and origins of Slavs."

Considering Ptolemy's Ouenedai and their location along the Baltic sea, the German linguist, Alexander M. Schenker, asserts that the vocabulary of the Slavic languages shows no evidence that the early Slavs were exposed to the sea. Schenker claims that Proto-Slavic had no maritime terminology and further claims it even lacked a word for amber. Based on this belief, and the fact that Ptolemy refers to the Baltic Sea as the "Venedic" Bay, Schenker decides against a possible identification of the Veneti of Ptolemy's times with today's Slavs. According to Gołąb, Schenker's conclusion is supported by the fact that to the east of the Venedae, Ptolemy mentions two further tribes called Stavanoi (Σταυανοί) and Souobenoi (Σουοβενοι), both of which have been interpreted as possibly the oldest historical attestations of at least some Slavs.

Others scholars have interpreted these as Prussian tribes (Sudini) as they follow other known Prussian tribes in Ptolemy's listing (e.g., the Galindae (Γαλίνδαι)). Moreover, that conclusion (Gołąb, Schenker), if correct, may only account for the Byzantine Slavs of Jordanes and Procopius since Jordanes clearly (see above) understands Veneti as a group at least as broad as today's Slavs but does not understand the converse to be the case (i.e., his "Slavs" are localized around Byzantium and north through Moravia only) since his Slavs remain a subset of the broader category of Veneti. It also is clear that the Byzantine term "Slav" had gradually replaced the Germanic "Winden"/"Wenden" as applied to all the people we would, today, consider Slavs.

It has been argued that the Veneti were a centum Indo-European people, rather than satem Baltic-speakers. Zbigniew Gołąb considers that the hydronyms of the Vistula and Odra river basins had a North-West Indo-European character with close affinities to the Italo-Celtic branch, but different from the Germanic branch, and show similarities with those attested in the area of the Adriatic Veneti (in Northeastern Italy) as well as those attested in the Western Balkans that are attributed to Illyrians, which points to a possible connection between these ancient Indo-European peoples.

In the 1980s and 1990s some Slovene authors proposed a theory according to which the Veneti were Proto-Slavs and bearers of the Lusatian culture along the Amber Path who settled the region between the Baltic Sea and Adriatic Sea and included the Adriatic Veneti, as presented in their book "Veneti – First Builders of European Community". This theory would place the Veneti as a pre-Celtic, pre-Latin and pre-Germanic population of Europe. The theory is rejected by mainstream historians and linguists.

== See also ==
- Lechites
- Veneti (disambiguation)
- Vends
- Wends

== Sources ==
- Agnes, Michael (Editor in Chief) (1999). "Webster's New World College Dictionary". Cleveland: MacMillan USA, 1999. ISBN 0-02-863118-8.
- Andersen, Henning (2003), "Slavic and the Indo-European Migrations", Language contacts in prehistory: studies in stratigraphy, John Benjamins Publishing Company, ISBN 1-58811-379-5.
- Curta, Florin (1997). "Slavs in Fredegar and Paul the Deacon: Medieval gens or scourge of God?" (PDF). Early Medieval Europe. 6 (2): 141–167. Archived from the original on 2025-07-20.
- Curta, Florin (1999). "Hiding Behind a Piece of Tapestry: Jordanes and the Slavic Venethi". Jahrbücher für Geschichte Osteuropas. 47 (3): 321–340.
- Curta, Florin (2001). The Making of the Slavs: History and Archaeology of the Lower Danube Region, c. 500–700. Cambridge: Cambridge University Press.
- Curta, Florin (2006). Southeastern Europe in the Middle Ages, 500–1250. Cambridge: Cambridge University Press.
- Dzino, Daniel (2010). Becoming Slav, Becoming Croat: Identity Transformations in Post-Roman and Early Medieval Dalmatia. Brill, 2010.
- Gołąb, Zbigniew (1992). The Origins of the Slavs: A Linguist's View. Columbus: Slavica Publishers.
- Krahe, Hans (1957). Vorgeschichtliche Sprachbeziehungen von den baltischen Ostseeländern bis zu den Gebieten um den Nordteil der Adria. Mainz: Akademie der Wissenschaften und der Literatur, 1957.
- Krahe, Hans (1954). Sprache und Vorzeit: Europäische Vorgeschichte nach dem Zeugnis der Sprache. Heidelberg: Quelle & Meyer, 1954.
- Okulicz, Jerzy (1986). Einige Aspekte der Ethnogenese der Balten und Slawen im Lichte archäologischer und sprachwissenschaftlicher Forschungen. Quaestiones medii aevi, Vol. 3, p. 7-34.
- Pokorny, Julius (1959). Indogermanisches Etymologisches Wörterbuch. Bern, München : Francke, 1959.
- Parczewski, Michał (1993). Die Anfänge der frühslawischen Kultur in Polen. Wien: Österreichische Gesellschaft für Ur- und Frühgeschichte, 1993. Veröffentlichungen der österreichischen Gesellschaft für Ur- und Frühgeschichte; Bd. 17.
- Pleterski, Andrej (1995). Model etnogeneze Slovanov na osnovi nekaterih novejših raziskav / A model of an Ethnogenesis of Slavs based on Some Recent Research. Zgodovinski časopis = Historical Review 49, No. 4, 1995, p. 537-556. ISSN 0350-5774. English summary: COBISS 4601165
- Schenker, Alexander M. (1996). The Dawn of Slavic: an Introduction to Slavic Philology. New Haven: Yale University Press, 1996. ISBN 0-300-05846-2.
- Schramm, Gottfried (1995). "Venedi, Antes, Sclaveni, Sclavi: Frühe Sammelbezeichnungen für slawische Stämme und ihr geschichtlicher Hintergrund". Jahrbücher für Geschichte Osteuropas. 43 (2): 161–200.
- Skrbiš, Zlatko (2002). The Emotional Historiography of Venetologists: Slovene Diaspora, Memory and Nationalism. Focaal: European Journal of Anthropology 39, 2002, p. 41-56.
- Steinacher, Roland (2002). Studien zur vandalischen Geschichte. Die Gleichsetzung der Ethnonyme Wenden, Slawen und Vandalen vom Mittelalter bis ins 18. Jahrhundert(doctoral thesis). Wien, 2002.
- Steinacher, Roland (2004). Wenden, Slawen, Vandalen. Eine frühmittelalterliche pseudologische Gleichsetzung und ihr Nachleben bis ins 18. Jahrhundert. In: W. Pohl (Hrsg.): Auf der Suche nach den Ursprüngen. Von der Bedeutung des frühen Mittelalters (Forschungen zur Geschichte des Mittelalters 8), Wien 2004, p. 329-353.
- Svašek, Maruška. Postsocialism politics and emotions in Central and Eastern Europe, Berghahn Books, 2006, ISBN 1-84545-124-4
- Vlasto, Alexis P. (1970). The Entry of the Slavs into Christendom: An Introduction to the Medieval History of the Slavs. Cambridge: Cambridge University Press.
