= Usan =

State in East Asia (512–930)

Usan 우산국 (于山國)
- ?–1022
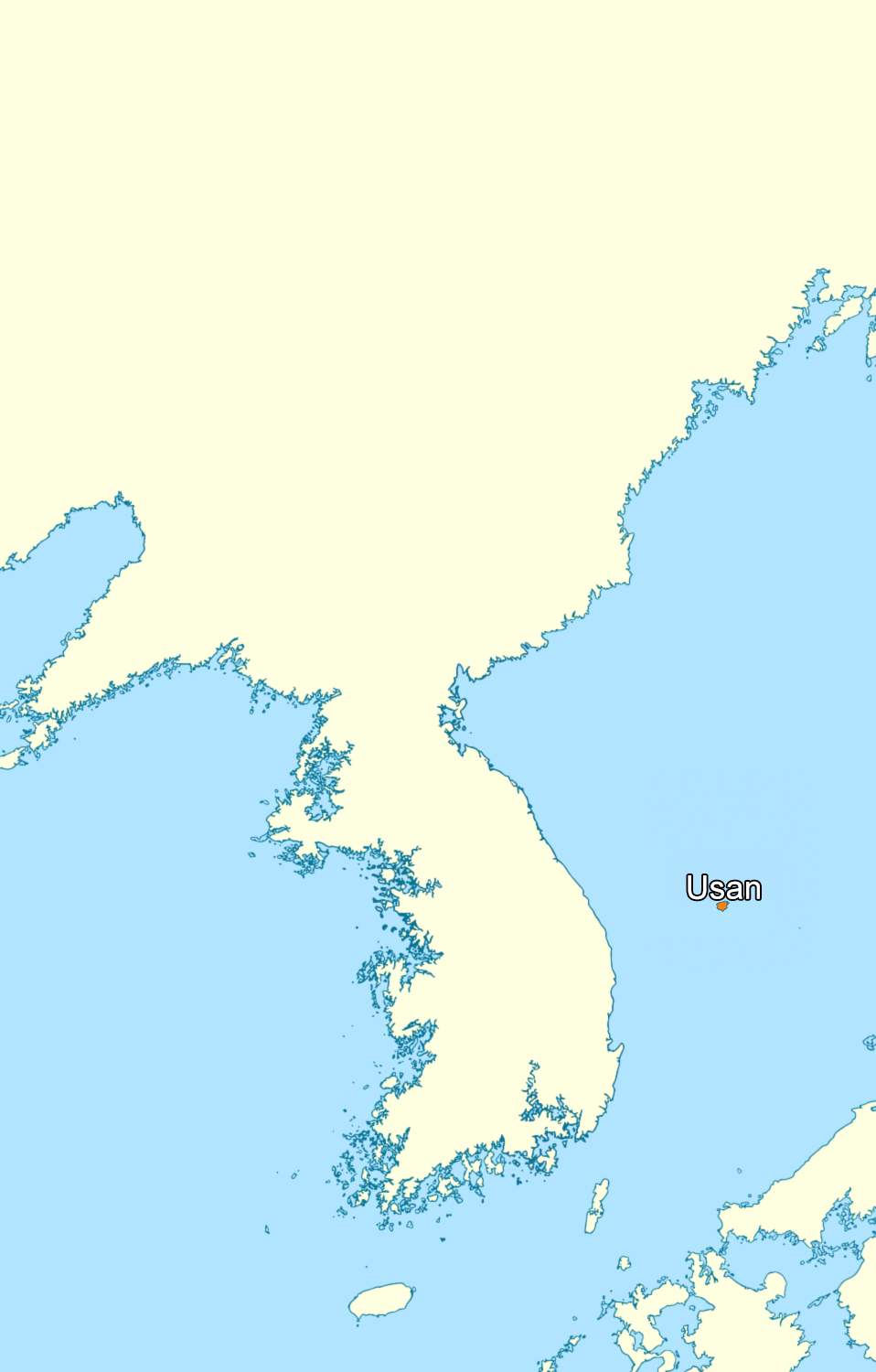
- Map of the approximate location of the State of Usan
- Status: Kingdom
- Government: Monarchy
- History
  - Established: ?
  - Subjugation by Silla under General Isabu: 512
  - Submission to Goryeo: 930
  - Incorporation into Goryeo: 1022
Succeeded by
Goryeo
- Today part of: South Korea ∟ Ulleungdo

Korean name
- Hangul: 우산국
- Hanja: 于山國
- RR: Usanguk
- MR: Usan'guk

Usan-guk or the State of Usan (Korean: 우산국; Hanja: 于山國) was a statelet that occupied the island Ulleungdo and several adjacent islands in Korea during the Three Kingdoms period. According to the Samguk sagi, it was conquered by the Silla general Kim Isabu in 512. He is said to have used wooden lions or tigers to intimidate the residents into surrendering. It has been written that the alias of Usan-guk is Ulleung-do. Usan-guk rarely entered into historical records, but appears to have continued a largely autonomous existence until its loss of independence to Goryeo in 930.

== History ==
=== Historical records ===
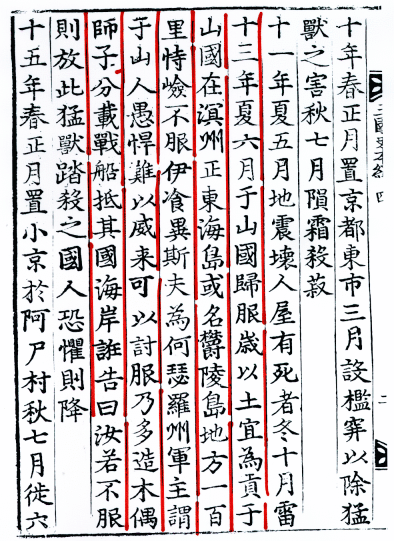
Samguk sagi Book 04. Silla's Records. In 512, Usan-guk（于山國）was Ulleungdo（鬱陵島）

Earliest records that appear in the Chinese Records of the Three Kingdoms indirectly attest the existence of the kingdom, which says "When Wang Qi (王頎) (of Cao Wei) has come to Okjeo to conquer Kung (Dongcheon of Goguryeo), he asked a local man whether there are people living in the east sea, and the man replied there are people living in an island that exists in the eastern seas, and they select a girl to put in the ocean every July."

In Samguk sagi, it is said that because of general Isabu's threats with wooden lions, Usan chose to be a vassal state to Silla in 512.

In Goryeosa, it is recorded that Usan requested to be submitted under the rule of Goryeo in 930 by sending Paekkil (백길; 白吉) and T'odu (토두; 土豆). In 1018, when Usan was severely affected by Jurchen invasions, the Goryeo king sent Yi Wŏn'gwi (이원귀; 李元龜) with farming equipment, and asked the locals of Usan who have fled from those invasions to return to their lands. Usan was finally abolished and fully incorporated in 1022 as all of the refugees from Usan were settled to the region of Yeju.

== Old Korean maps ==
Usan

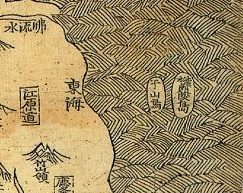
Joseon map (1530): Ulleungdo (鬱陵島) and Usan (于山島)

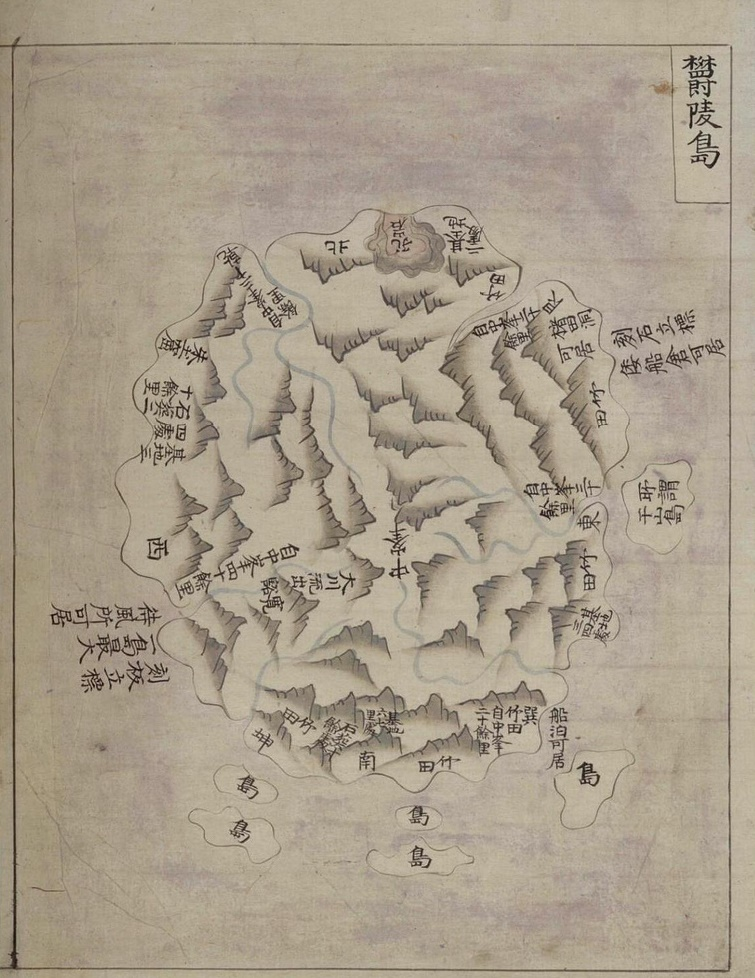
廣輿圖 (Gwang Yeodo,1737-1776)
This map showed Ulleungdo with a small island off its eastern shore labeled as "the so-called Usando" (所謂 于山島).

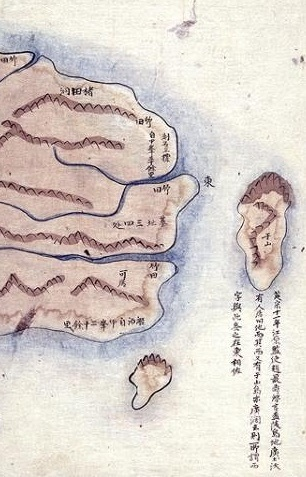
Kim Jeong-ho "Daedongyeojido" (1861): East of Ulleungdo (鬱陵島) and Usando (于山)

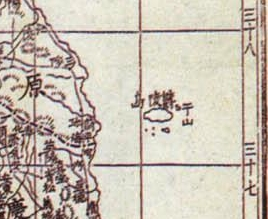
A map by the Korean Empire: Ulleungdo (鬱陵島) and Usan (于山)
