= Kingdom of Cat =

Pictish kingdom

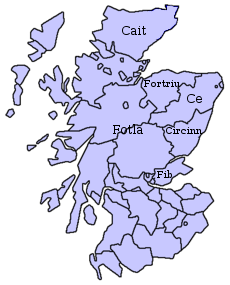
This map of Scotland shows roughly where the Pictish kingdoms were located, superimposed on a (simplified) map of the traditional counties of Scotland.

Cait or Cat was a Pictish kingdom originating in 800 during the Early Middle Ages. It was centered in what is now Caithness in northern Scotland. It was, according to Pictish legend, founded by Caitt (or Cat), one of the seven sons of the ancestor figure Cruithne. The territory of Cait covered not only modern Caithness, but also southeast Sutherland.

The place name Caithness derives from Cait, which is also preserved in the Gaelic name for Sutherland (Cataibh), in several specific names within that county and in the earliest recorded name for Shetland (Inse Catt, meaning "islands of the Cat people").

William J. Watson compared this usage with the early Irish Innse Orc (islands of the boars) for Orkney and concluded that these are tribal names based on animals.

== History ==
During the 6th century, the Gaels from Ireland began to assert dominance over the Picts. By the mid-500s, the Gaels had taken control of Caithness and established the kingdom of Dál Riata, which stretched from Caithness to the Isle of Man. Dál Riata played a significant role in the development of Scottish culture.

In the 8th and 9th centuries, Norse influence became prominent in Caithness. Norse raiders and settlers established a significant presence along the coast, leading to Caithness becoming part of the Norse Earldom of Orkney. The earls, often from the powerful Orkneyinga dynasty, and exerted control over the region during this period.

== See also ==
- Fortriu
- Kingdom of Ce
- Scotland in the Early Middle Ages
