= Cé (Pictish territory) =

Medieval Pictish kingdom in Scotland

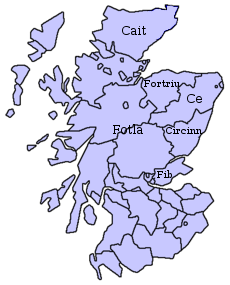
This map of Scotland shows roughly the area the Pictish kingdoms were located, superimposed on a map of modern Scotland.

Cé was a Pictish territory recorded during the Early Medieval period and located in the area of modern-day Aberdeenshire, Scotland.

== Sources ==
The author of the Pictish Chronicle records that the Cé was formed after the division of Alba among the seven sons of Cruithne. Cé was the first and eponymous king, and his reign lasted fifteen years. Some sources dispute this, giving him a reign of eleven, twelve or twenty years.

The seven sons, or provinces, of Cruithne represent divisions within the Pictish nation. The kingdoms were ruled by hereditary chiefs (later known as mormaers). Irish sources sometimes refer to them as kings (ríg), although it was standard practice for all Irish rulers to be so named, with their actual rank denoted by an adjective. In times of weak central control, these local rulers would have certainly been more independent.

Cé appears in the titles of two lost sagas recorded in 10th and 11th century Irish tale-lists: The Ravaging of Bennachie (Old Irish: Orgain Benne Cé), which is about the battle of Bennachie (Peak of Ce), and The Ravaging of the Plain of Ce by Galo son of Febal (Old Irish: Orgain Maige Cé la Galo mac Febail), which is about the destruction of the plain of Cé. Another medieval Irish tale features a character called Frigrui, described as an artificer of the "Pictish plain of Cé" (Old Irish: Cruthmag Cé), confirming the territory's Pictish status.

Adomnán's Life of Columba records Columba in the late 6th century baptising a man called Artbranan, described as the "chief commander of the warband of the region of Cé" (Latin: Primarius Geonae cohortis).

== Location ==
The name of Cé survives in the placename of the mountain Bennachie in modern-day Aberdeenshire, which means "Mountain of the people of Cé" and suggests that the hillfort on Bennachie's Mither Tap may have been Cé's preeminent settlement. The Plain of Cé would therefore have included Garioch, Donside and the coastal plain of Aberdeenshire to the east, perhaps centred on the watershed of the River Ury.

Cé encompassed Banff, Buchan, and other areas of Aberdeenshire, such as the region now known as Mar.

After the Roman period, a number of Pictish kingdoms formed in Eastern Scotland. The kingdom of Circind, which was further divided into the kingdoms of Fotla (Atholl), Fib (Fife) and Circind (county of Angus), bordered the kingdom of Cé to the south. In the west, around modern Inverness, might have been the kingdom of Fidach. In the far north and the Northern Isles was the kingdom of Cat, which later gave the name to the county of Caithness.

By the 6th century, the Pictish people were divided into the larger kingdoms of the Northern and Southern Picts. Cé can be regarded as a frontier region between northern and southern Pictish influence.

Cé may also have included Mortlach, near modern Dufftown, which was the original seat of what became the later Diocese of Aberdeen, whose origins may lie as the episcopate of the district of Cé around 700.

Nothing is known of the political status or structure of Cé and there is no evidence that it had its own kings.

== See also ==
- Fortriu
- Scotland in the Early Middle Ages
