= 734 =

Calendar year

734 in various calendars
Gregorian calendar	734; DCCXXXIV
Ab urbe condita	1487
Armenian calendar	183; ԹՎ ՃՁԳ
Assyrian calendar	5484
Balinese saka calendar	655–656
Bengali calendar	140–141
Berber calendar	1684
Buddhist calendar	1278
Burmese calendar	96
Byzantine calendar	6242–6243
Chinese calendar	癸酉年 (Water Rooster); 3431 or 3224 — to — 甲戌年 (Wood Dog); 3432 or 3225
Coptic calendar	450–451
Discordian calendar	1900
Ethiopian calendar	726–727
Hebrew calendar	4494–4495
- Hindu calendars
Vikram Samvat	790–791
Shaka Samvat	655–656
Kali Yuga	3834–3835
Holocene calendar	10734
Iranian calendar	112–113
Islamic calendar	115–116
Japanese calendar	Tenpyō 6 (天平６年)
Javanese calendar	627–628
Julian calendar	734; DCCXXXIV
Korean calendar	3067
Minguo calendar	1178 before ROC 民前1178年
Nanakshahi calendar	−734
Seleucid era	1045/1046 AG
Thai solar calendar	1276–1277
Tibetan calendar	ཆུ་མོ་བྱ་ལོ་ (female Water-Bird); 860 or 479 or −293 — to — ཤིང་ཕོ་ཁྱི་ལོ་ (male Wood-Dog); 861 or 480 or −292

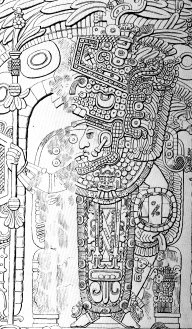
Yikʼin Chan Kʼawiil of Tikal

Year 734 (DCCXXXIV) was a common year starting on Friday of the Julian calendar, the 734th year of the Common Era (CE) and Anno Domini (AD) designations, the 734th year of the 1st millennium, the 34th year of the 8th century, and the 5th year of the 730s decade. The denomination 734 for this year has been used since the early medieval period, when the Anno Domini calendar era became the prevalent method in Europe for naming years.

== Events ==
=== By place ===
==== Europe ====
- Battle of the Boarn: The Franks under Charles Martel, mayor of the palace of Neustria and Austrasia, defeat the Frisians near the mouth of the River Boarn (now the Dutch province of Friesland). During the battle, the Frisian army is beaten and King Poppo is killed. The Franks gain control of the Frisian lands west of the Lauwers (Netherlands), and begin plundering the pagan sanctuaries. The Frisians become Frankish vassals, apart from the tribes living in East Frisia in present-day Germany.
- Umayyad conquest of Gaul: Muslim forces under Abd al-Malik ibn Qatn al-Fihri, governor (wali) of Al-Andalus (modern Spain), enter Provence and raid the Rhône Valley. The cities of Avignon, Arles, and probably Marseille are handed over by Count Maurontus, who is in rebellion against Charles Martel.
- September 8 – Frithubeorht is consecrated Bishop of Hexham.

==== Mesoamerica ====
- Jasaw Chan Kʼawiil I, ruler (ajaw) of Tikal (Guatemala), dies after a 52-year reign. He is succeeded by his son Yikʼin Chan Kʼawiil, who becomes one of Tikal's most successful and expansionary rulers during the Late Classic period.
- During the Third Tikal–Calakmul War, Kʼakʼ Tiliw Chan Yopaat gives himself the title k’uhul ajaw, thus declaring Quiriguá's independence from Copán.

==== Asia ====
- March 23 – A large earthquake strikes the Tang dynasty city of Qinzhou (in the vicinity of modern-day Tianshui City), causing serious damage and killing around 4000 people.
- Bilge Qaghan, khagan of the Second Turkic Khaganate, is poisoned and killed by Buyruk Chor, an emissary once sent to Tang Emperor Xuanzong. He is succeeded by his son Yollıg.
- December – Khitan military chief Ketuyu and khagan Yaonian Qulie are assassinated by their subordinate Li Guozhe, ending the Ketuyu rebellion.

== Births ==
- Fujiwara no Kurajimaro, Japanese politician (d. 775)
- Khurshid II, ruler (ispahbadh) of Tabaristan (d. 761)

== Deaths ==
- June 3 – Simeon of the Olives, Syriac bishop of Harran (b. 624/5)
- July 30 – Tatwine, Mercian archbishop of Canterbury (b. c.670?)
- Bilge Qaghan, ruler (khagan) of the Second Turkic Khaganate (b. 683/4)
- Bilihildis, Frankish noblewoman and abbess
- Bubo, Duke of the Frisians
- Approximate date – Caintigern, Irish-born hermit
- Jasaw Chan Kʼawiil I, ruler (ajaw) of Tikal
- December – Ketuyu, Khitan military chief

== Sources ==
- Xu Elina-Qian, Historical Development of the Pre-Dynastic Khitan, University of Helsinki, 2005. 273 pages.
