= History of the administrative divisions of China =

The history of the administrative divisions of China is covered in the following articles:

- Administration of territory in dynastic China (before 1912)
  - Ancient Chinese states (before 221 bce)
  - Administrative divisions of the Tang dynasty (618–907)
  - Administrative divisions of the Liao dynasty (916–1125)
  - Administrative divisions of the Yuan dynasty (1271–1368)
  - Administrative divisions of the Qing dynasty (1636–1912)
- Administrative divisions of the Republic of China (1912–1949)
- History of the administrative divisions of China (1949–present), the People's Republic of China

== See also ==
- General History of Chinese Administrative Divisions, 13-volume book series
- Administrative divisions of China
- Districts of Hong Kong
- Municipal Affairs Bureau (Macau: Municipalities and Parishes)
- Administrative divisions of Taiwan (Republic of China)
