= Administrative divisions of the Qing dynasty =

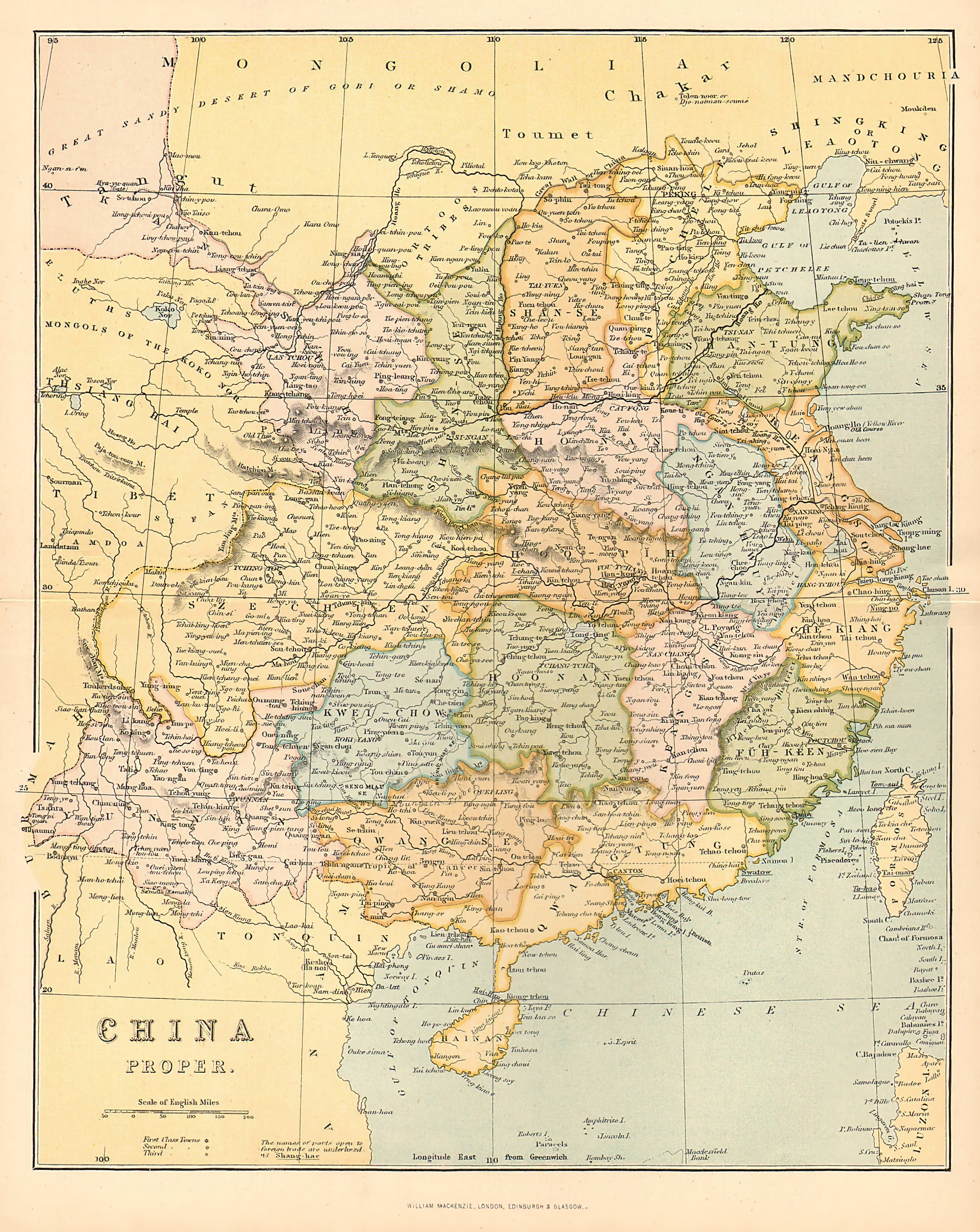
Map of the 18 provinces of China proper in 1866

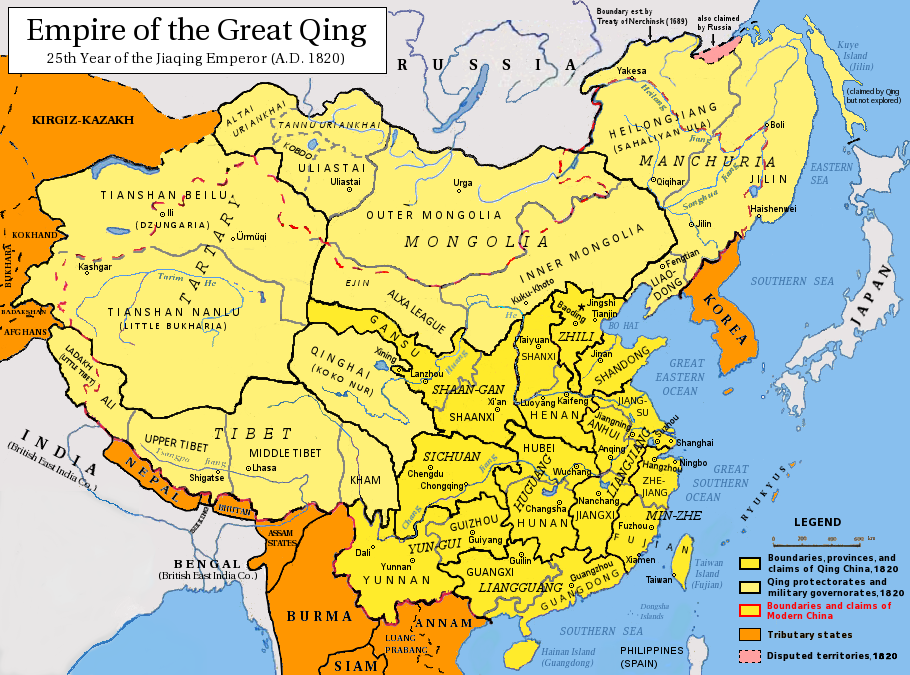
The Qing Empire in 1820. The Inner Asian regions are shown in light yellow (different from the dark yellow area, the eighteen provinces).

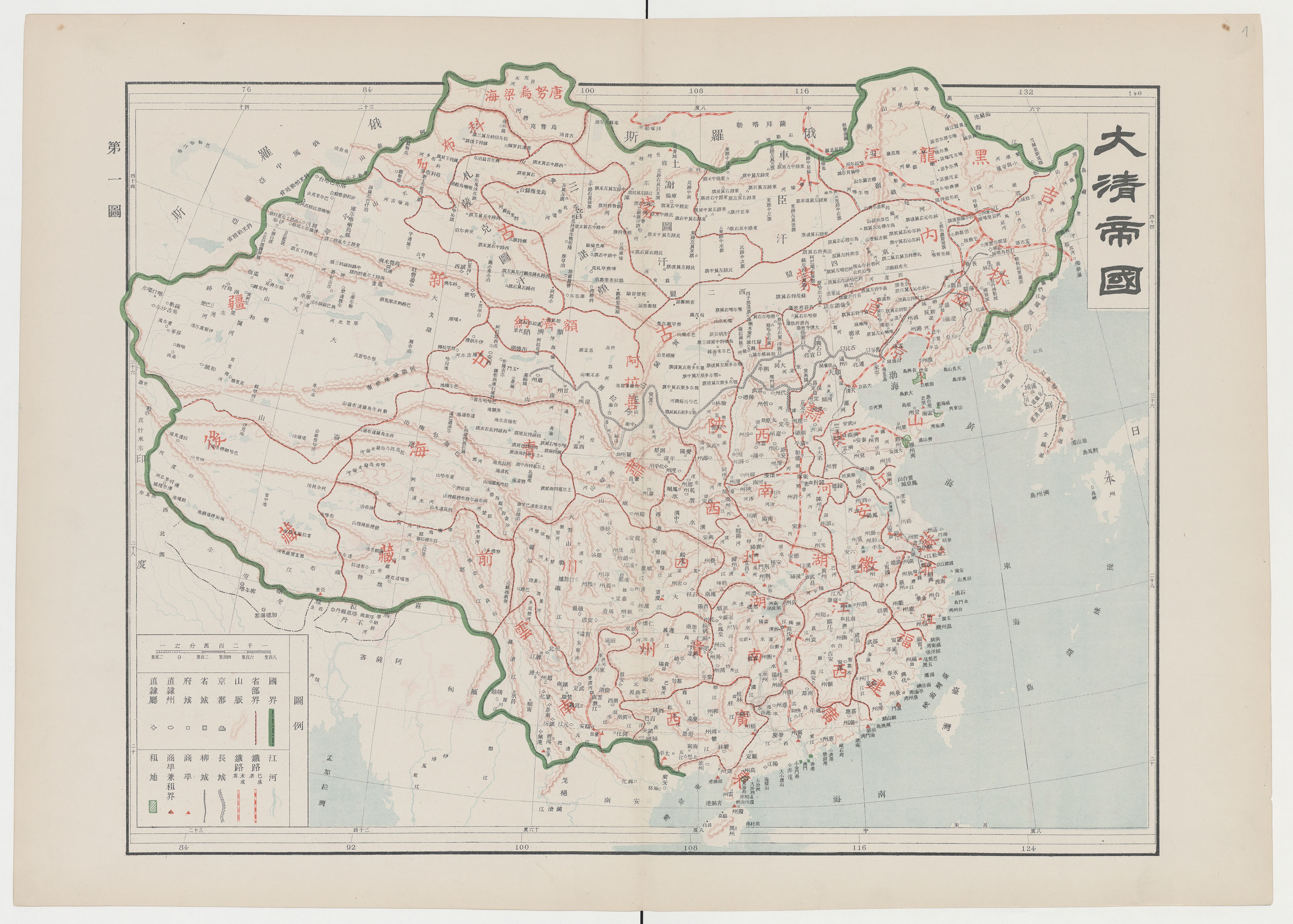
Official map of the Qing Empire published by the Qing in 1905.

The Qing dynasty was a Manchu-led imperial Chinese dynasty and last imperial dynasty in Chinese history. The administrative system of the Qing dynasty was based on the idea of "adapting to the times and the place, and making adjustments according to circumstances".

== The interior provinces ==
=== Early period ===
Initially, the Qing dynasty expanded the Ming province system from 15 to 18 provinces, with the interior of the Qing dynasty comprising Beijing (the capital city) and these eighteen provinces (also known as China proper).

=== Late Qing ===
During the late Qing dynasty, there were efforts to extend the province system of China proper to the rest of the empire. Xinjiang was reorganized into a province in 1884 and later Manchuria was split into the three provinces of Fengtian, Jilin and Heilongjiang in 1907. Taiwan was converted into a separate province in 1885, but was then ceded to Japan in 1895 following the First Sino-Japanese War.

There was discussion to do the same in Inner and Outer Mongolia and Tibet-Qinghai, but these proposals were not put in practice. These areas remained outside the provincial system of China proper when the Qing dynasty fell.

== Governance over the provinces ==
Unlike the Ming provincial administration which consisted of three governors the Qing provinces were governed by a single governor or "Xunfu (巡抚)" who held substantial power. Although all provincial agencies communicated with the central government through him, he himself was subordinate to a governor-general "Zongdu (总督)". While nominally superior to a governor, usually the governors-general cooperated closely with the governor and acted jointly in reporting to the central government.

Under the authority of the governors were two types of agencies: the Provincial Administration Commissions and the Provincial Surveillance Commissions. The Provincial Administration Commissioner, acting as a lieutenant-general, handled financial duties. The Provincial Surveillance Commissioner managed judicial and oversight functions. Additionally, each province had an unofficial Provincial Education Commissioner who oversaw educational institutions and certified candidates for the civil service exams. Circuit Intendants, known as "Daotai (道臺)" operated within the provincial administration as liaisons between the prefectures and the provincial authorities.

== Regions ==
China in the Qing dynasty was divided into five major regions: The Interior (Beijing and eighteen provinces), Guandong (Three Eastern Provinces), Xinjiang (Chinese Turkestan), the Mongolian steppe (Inner and Outer Mongolia), Qinghai and Tibet. The Qing government agency known as Lifan Yuan oversaw the administrations of the empire's Inner Asian territories, which were also collectively known as Chinese Tartary by contemporary Europeans.

== Tributary states and vassals ==
The Qing dynasty had a total of approximately 19 tributary states and a few vassals (not all at the same time) under the traditional tributary system of China.

State	Start of tribute/vassalage	End of tribute/vassalage	Notes
Joseon	since the Ming	1895	The Qing had a laissez-faire policy towards them. Japanese occupied by 1894, later annexed by Japan.
(Ryukyu Kingdom) Ryukyu	1646	1875	Incorporated into Okinawa Prefecture in 1879, ending all tributary relations with China. Last tribute sent in 1875.
(Sulu Sultanate) Sulu	1726	1733	Was a tributary state of Ming for around 300 years before restarting tributary relations with China.
(Nguyen dynasty) Vietnam	between the Tang & Song	1885	
Luang Prabang	1730	1893	
Thailand	since the Sui	1852	
(Konbaung dynasty) Konbaung	1770	1885	Konbaung fought four wars successfully against the Qing. Despite victory they sued for peace with China in 1770 to enable trade relations.
(Kingdom of Sikkim) Sikkim	1720	1890	Sikkim became a protectorate of Tibet in 1670, which itself became a part of Qing China (and with it Sikkim) in 1720.
(Kingdom of Nepal) Nepal	1791	1908	
(State of Hunza) Hunza	1761	1892	
(Khanate of Kokand) Kokand	1774	1798	Forced into being a protectorate and tributary of the Qing dynasty.
Kazakhstan	Unknown	1847	
Kyrgyzstan	1842	1854	

== See also ==
- Administrative divisions of the Tang dynasty
- Administrative divisions of the Liao dynasty
- Administrative divisions of the Yuan dynasty
- Administration of territory in dynastic China
- Administrative divisions of China
- History of the administrative divisions of China
- Government of the Qing dynasty
- Tributary system of China
