= Ketuyu =

Ketuyu (Chinese: 可突于; died 734) was a Khitan military chief, notable for his Ketuyu rebellion. Despite the presence of a khagan, he de facto controlled Khitan politics. His power made the Khitan khagan jealous, and he then defended himself by making a coup in 720, against Li Shaogu(李邵固). By this action, he incurred Tang dynasty opposition and they sent military campaigns against him, which he defeated several times. He was eventually crushed by repeated Tang campaigns, and was murdered together with Wa khaghan(洼可汗) Yaonian Qulie(遙輦屈列) by his subordinate Li Guozhe(李過折).

== See also ==
- Ketuyu rebellion
- List of the Khitan rulers

== Sources ==
- Xu Elina-Qian, Historical Development of the Pre-Dynastic Khitan, University of Helsinki, 2005. 273 pages.
