= Political divisions and vassals of the Mongol Empire =

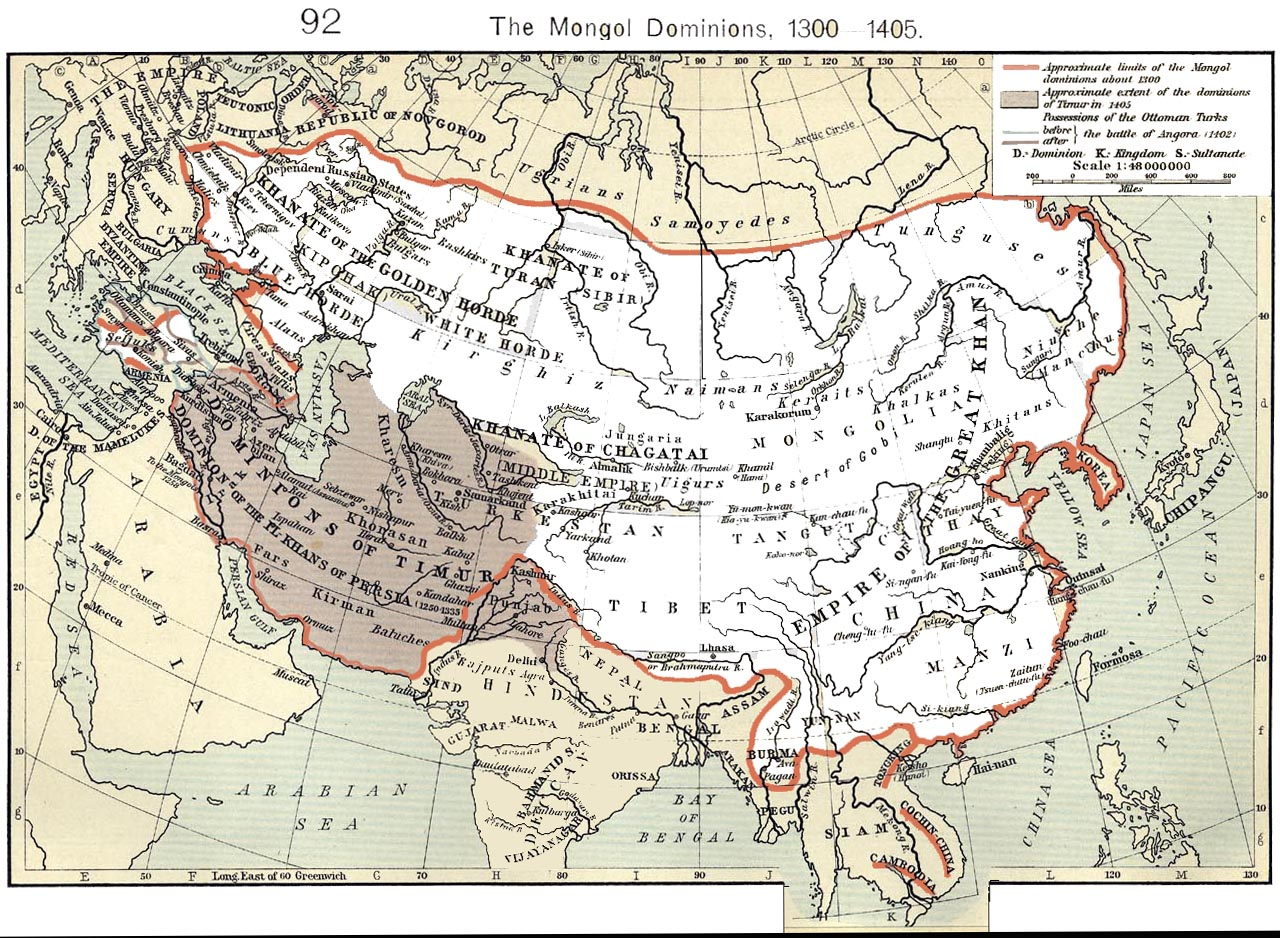
The Mongol world, ca. 1300. The gray area is the later Timurid Empire.

Through invasions and conquests the Mongols established a vast empire that included many political divisions, vassals and tributary states. It was the largest contiguous land empire in history. However, after the death of Möngke Khan, the Toluid Civil War and subsequent wars had led to the fragmentation of the Mongol Empire. By 1294, the empire had fractured into four autonomous khanates, including the Golden Horde in the northwest, the Chagatai Khanate in the middle, the Ilkhanate in the southwest, and the Yuan dynasty (Note: As per modern historiographical norm, the "Yuan dynasty" in this article refers exclusively to the realm based in Dadu (present-day Beijing). However, the Han-style dynastic name "Great Yuan" (大元) as proclaimed by Kublai, as well as the claim to Chinese political orthodoxy were meant to be applied to the entire Mongol Empire. In spite of this, "Yuan dynasty" is rarely used in the broad sense of the definition by modern scholars due to the de facto disintegrated nature of the Mongol Empire.) in the east based in modern-day Beijing, although the Yuan emperors held the nominal title of Khagan of the empire.

== Political divisions of the early Mongol Empire ==
The political divisions of the early Mongol Empire consisted of five main parts in addition to appanage khanates - there were:

- Mongolia, Southern Siberia and Manchuria under Karakorum;
- North China and Tibet under Yanjing Department;
- Khorazm, Mawarannahr and the Hami Oases under Beshbalik Department
- Persia, Georgia, Armenia, Cilicia and Turkey (former Seljuk ruled parts) under Amu Dar'ya Department
- Golden Horde. According to notable Russian scholars A.P.Grigorev and O.B.Frolova, the Ulus of Jochids had 10 provinces: 1. Khiva or Khorazm, 2. Desht-i-Kipchak, 3. Khazaria, 4. Crimea, 5. the Banks of Azov, 6. the country of Circassians, 7. Bulgar, 8. Walachia, 9. Alania, 10. Russian lands.

When Genghis Khan was campaigning in Central Asia, his entrusted general Muqali (1170–1223) attempted to set up provinces and established branch departments of state affairs. But Ögedei abolished them and divided the areas of North China into 10 routes (lu, 路) according to the suggestion of Yelü Chucai, a prominent Confucian statesman of Khitan ethnicity. He also divided the empire into Beshbalik administration, Yanjing administration while the headquarters in Karakorum directly dealt with Manchuria, Mongolia and Southern Siberia. Late in his reign, Amu Darya administration was established. Under Möngke Khan, these administrations were renamed Branch Departments.

== Yuan dynasty ==
Kublai (Emperor Shizu), the founder of the Yuan dynasty, made significant reforms to the existing institutions. He established the Yuan dynasty in 1271 and claimed orthodox political succession from the Three Sovereigns and Five Emperors to the Tang dynasty. The Yuan forces seized southern China by defeating the Southern Song dynasty and the Yuan dynasty unified all of China proper under its rule. On the other hand, Kublai had effectively lost control over the western khanates. The territory of the Yuan dynasty was divided into the Central Region (腹裏) governed by the Central Secretariat (Zhongshu Sheng) and places under the control of various Branch Secretariats (行中書省) or the Bureau of Buddhist and Tibetan Affairs (Xuanzheng Yuan).

== Golden Horde ==
The two main divisions of the Golden Horde (Jochid Ulus) are known as the White horde and the Blue horde, also Batu's Ulus (district) and Orda's Ulus.

== Vassals and tributary states ==
The Mongol Empire at its greatest extent included all of modern-day Mongolia, China, much or all of Russia, Ukraine, Cilicia, Anatolia, Georgia, Armenia, Iran, Iraq, Korea, Afghanistan, Central Asia, parts of Burma, Romania and Pakistan. In the meantime, many countries became vassals or tributary states of the Mongol Empire.

=== European vassals and tributary states ===
- Grand Duchy of Lithuania, the nominal vassal. However, Mongols under Orda and Burundai successfully invaded southern regions of Lithuania in 1241 and in 1259 (Later Nogai), Jogaila, the Grand Duke of Lithuania and the King of Poland, officially acknowledged Tokhtamysh as overlord in 1382 after the fall of the Yuan in 1368. The Mongols of the Golden Horde always counted the Lithuanians among their subjects, and Tokhtamysh demanded the Lithuanian ruler for him to collect taxes from Kiev (then under Jogaila and his successors) for his campaign against the Timurids.
- A number of Russian states, including the Republic of Novgorod, Pskov and Smolensk. Batu Khan could not reach northern part of Russia due to the marshlands surrounding city-states such as Novgorod and Pskov in 1239. But the combined effects of Alexander Nevsky's diplomacy, Mongol threats and invasions by the Teutonic Knights, forced Novgorod and later Pskov to accept the terms of vassalage. In 1274, the last of the Russian principalities became subject to the Horde of Möngke-Temür. The khans considered the Russian principalities to be part of their dominion and therefore took censuses in order to tax the people who lived there. Although direct rule was not imposed, the grand prince of Vladimir, the leading Russian prince, was closely supervised and the khans later placed the throne in the hands of Moscow.
- Byzantine Empire. When an Egyptian diplomat was arrested by emperor Michael VIII Palaiologos, Sultan Baibars insisted his ally Berke Khan to attack the Greek Empire. In the winter of 1265 Nogai Khan led a Mongol raid on Byzantine Thrace with his vassal Bulgaria. In the spring of 1265 he defeated the armies of Michael and freed the diplomat and former Seljuk sultan Kaykaus II. Instead of fighting, most of the Byzantines fled. Michael managed to escape with the assistance of Italian merchants. After this Thrace was plundered by Nogai's army, and the Byzantine emperor signed a treaty with Berke of the Golden Horde, giving his daughter Euphrosyne in marriage to Nogai. Michael also sent much valuable fabric to the Golden Horde as a tribute thereafter. But after that event, the imperial court of Byzantium developed and retained a policy of good relations with both the Golden Horde and the Ilkhanate, which became allies against intrusion of the Mamluks of Egypt and the Ghazi emirs of Anatolia.
- Second Bulgarian Empire. During the end of Mongol invasion of Europe, the Bulgarians under Ivan Asen II tried to destroy Mongol tumen. But Kadan's raids through Bulgaria on his retreat from Central Europe induced the young Kaliman I of Bulgaria to pay tribute and accept Mongol suzerainty. According to a letter of Béla IV to the pope written in 1254 indicates that at that time the Bulgarians were still paying tribute to the Mongols.
- Kingdom of Serbia. Around 1288 Milutin launched an invasion to pacify two Bulgarian nobles in what is now north-east Serbia, in the Branicevo region, but those nobles were vassals of the Bulgarian prince of Vidin, Shishman. Shishman attacked Milutin but was defeated and Milutin in return sacked his capital Vidin. But Shishman was a vassal of Nogai Khan, the de facto ruler of the Golden Horde. Nogai Khan threatened to punish Milutin for his insolence, but changed his mind when the Serbian king sent him gifts and hostages. Among the hostages was his son Stefan Dečanski, who managed to escape back to Serbia after Nogai Khan's death in 1299.
- Kingdom of Hungary.

=== Southeast Asian vassals and tributary states ===
- Đại Việt (Vietnam). After the Vietnamese captured Mongol envoys sent to ask a route to attack Southern China, the Mongol forces invaded the Trần dynasty in 1257. The Mongols routed city defenders and massacred inhabitants of capital Thăng Long (Hanoi). King Than Tong agreed to pay tributes to Möngke Khan to spare his country. At the same time, the Mongols were unable to withstand the tropical heat, mosquitoes and malaria. So they retreated after securing a promise of tribute from the king. When Kublai Khan demanded full submission of the dynasty where Mongol darughachis were well received before, the relationship between two states deteriorated in 1264. The Mongols then launched two large-scale invasions in 1285 and 1288, both were repulsed. But the king of Đại Việt or Trần dynasty eventually accepted Mongol suzerainty to avoid further conflicts.
- Champa. Although king Ve Indrawarman of Champa expressed his desire to accept the Yuan rule in 1278, his son and subjects ignored the submission. The Mongol forces lost in the country and their general was killed, however, they defeated all forces of Champa in open battles in 1283. But Champa force managed to wear down the invading force by waging a guerrilla warfare against them. The Mongols finally retreated. After Mongol invasion in 1288 failed, the king of Champa also started sending tributes to avoid further bloodshed.
- Khmer Empire. In 1278, a Mongol envoy was executed by the Khmer king. An envoy was sent again to demand submission when the Yuan army was besieging the fortress in Champa. 100 Mongol cavalries sent to Khmer after the imprisonment of the second envoy. They were ambushed and destroyed by the Khmers. However, the King of Khmer Empire asked a pardon and sent tribute in 1285 due to his war-like neighbours and Kublai Khan's rage.
- Sukhothai Kingdom and Chiangmai or Taiyo. When Kublai sent Mongol forces to protect his vassals in Burma, Thai states including Sukhothai and Taiyo accepted Mongol supremacy. King Ramkhamhaeng and other Thai and Khmer leaders visited the Yuan court to show their loyalty several times.
- Small states of the Malay Peninsula. Kublai sent surrounding nations his envoys to demand their submission in 1270-1280. Most of states in Indo-China and Malay accepted the demand. According to Marco Polo, those subjects sent tribute on to the Mongol court, including elephants, rhinoceroses, jewels and a tooth of Buddha. One notable scholar identified that these acts of submission were more ceremonial in some regard. During the Mongol invasion of Java in 1293, small states of Malay and Sumatra submitted and sent envoys or hostages to them. Native people of modern Taiwan and Philippines helped the Mongol armada but they were never conquered.

=== East and Central Asian vassals and tributary states ===
- Kingdom of Goryeo. The Mongol invasions of Korea consisted of a series of campaigns by the Mongol Empire against Korea, then known as Goryeo, from 1231 to 1270. There were six major campaigns at tremendous cost to civilian lives throughout the Korean peninsula, ultimately resulting in Korea becoming a semi-autonomous vassal state of the Mongol Yuan dynasty for approximately 80 years. The Mongol Empire and the Kingdom of Goryeo tied with marriages as Mongol princesses were married to Korean Kings, while Mongol Emperors took many Korean women as concubines. A Korean woman called the Empress Gi became an empress through her marriage with Ukhaantu Khan, and her son, Biligtü Khan of the Northern Yuan dynasty, became a Mongol Khan. King Chungnyeol of Goryeo married a daughter of Kubilai Khan, and marriages between Mongol and Korea continued for eighty years. The Goryeo dynasty survived under Mongolian influence until King Gongmin began to push Mongolian garrisons of the Yuan back starting in the 1350s. Goryeo was the lowest rank vassal of the Mongols, below the Karluks and Uighurs, because the Koreans surrendered last.
- Kingdom of Qocho, a Buddhist Uighur Kingdom. When the Mongols placed the Uighurs of the Kingdom of Qocho over the Koreans at the court the Korean King objected, then the Mongol Emperor Kublai Khan rebuked the Korean King, saying that the Uighur King of Qocho was ranked higher than the Karluk Kara-Khanid ruler, who in turn was ranked higher than the Korean King, who was ranked last, because the Uighurs surrendered to the Mongols first, the Karluks surrendered after the Uighurs, and the Koreans surrendered last, and that the Uighurs surrendered peacefully without violently resisting.
- The Karluks.
- Maharajah of Yunnan. King Duan Xingzhi of Dali was then enfeoffed as Maharaja (摩诃罗嵯) by the Yuan Emperor Kublai Khan, and the Dali Kingdom Duan royal family continued to hold the title of Maharaja in Yunnan as vassals to the Mongols. After the Ming dynasty conquered Yunnan from the Yuan, the Duan royals were shipped off to the Ming capital of Nanjing by the Hongwu Emperor.
- The indigenous people of Sakhalin. The Mongol forces made several attacks on Sakhalin, beginning in 1264 and continuing until 1308. Economically, the conquest of new peoples provided further wealth for the tribute-based Yuan dynasty. The Nivkhs and the Oroks were subjugated by the Mongols. However, the Ainu people raided Mongol posts every year. The Ainus finally accepted Mongol supremacy in 1308.

=== Middle Eastern vassals and tributary states ===
- Principality of Antioch and County of Tripoli. The small crusader state paid annual tributes for many years. The closest thing to actual Frankish cooperation with Mongol military actions was the overlord-subject relationship between the Mongols and the Franks of Antioch and others. Mongols lost their vassal and ally Franks as the fall of Antioch in 1268 and Tripoli in 1289 to the Mamluks.
- Empire of Trebizond. The Seljuks and the military forces of Trebizond were defeated by the Mongols in 1243. After that, Kaykhusraw II, the Sultan of Iconium was compelled to pay tribute and supply annually horses, hunting dogs, and jewels. The emperor Manuel I of Trebizond, realizing the impossibility of fighting the Mongols, made a speedy peace with them and, on condition of paying an annual tribute, became a Mongol vassal. The empire reached its greatest prosperity and had opportunity to export the produce of its own rich hinterland during the era of Ilkhans. But with the decline of Mongol power in 1335, Trebizond suffered increasingly from Turkish attacks, civil wars, and domestic intrigues.

== See also ==
- Mongol invasions and conquests
- Division of the Mongol Empire

== Sources ==
- Favereau, Marie (20 April 2021). The Horde: How the Mongols Changed the World. Harvard University Press. ISBN 978-0-674-24421-4.
