= Administrative divisions of the Yuan dynasty =

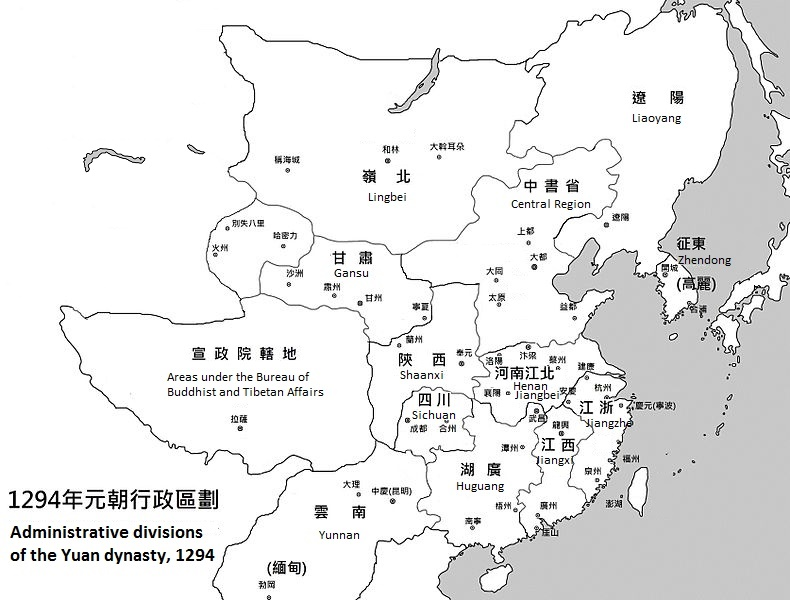
Administrative divisions of the Yuan dynasty.

The Yuan dynasty was a Mongol-led imperial Chinese dynasty. During its existence, its territory was divided into the Central Region (腹裏) governed by the Central Secretariat (Zhongshu Sheng) and places under control of various provinces (行省) or Branch Secretariats (行中書省), as well as the region under the Bureau of Buddhist and Tibetan Affairs (Xuanzheng Yuan). In addition, the Yuan emperors held nominal suzerainty over the western Mongol khanates, but in reality none of them were governed by the Yuan dynasty due to the division of the Mongol Empire.

== Overview ==
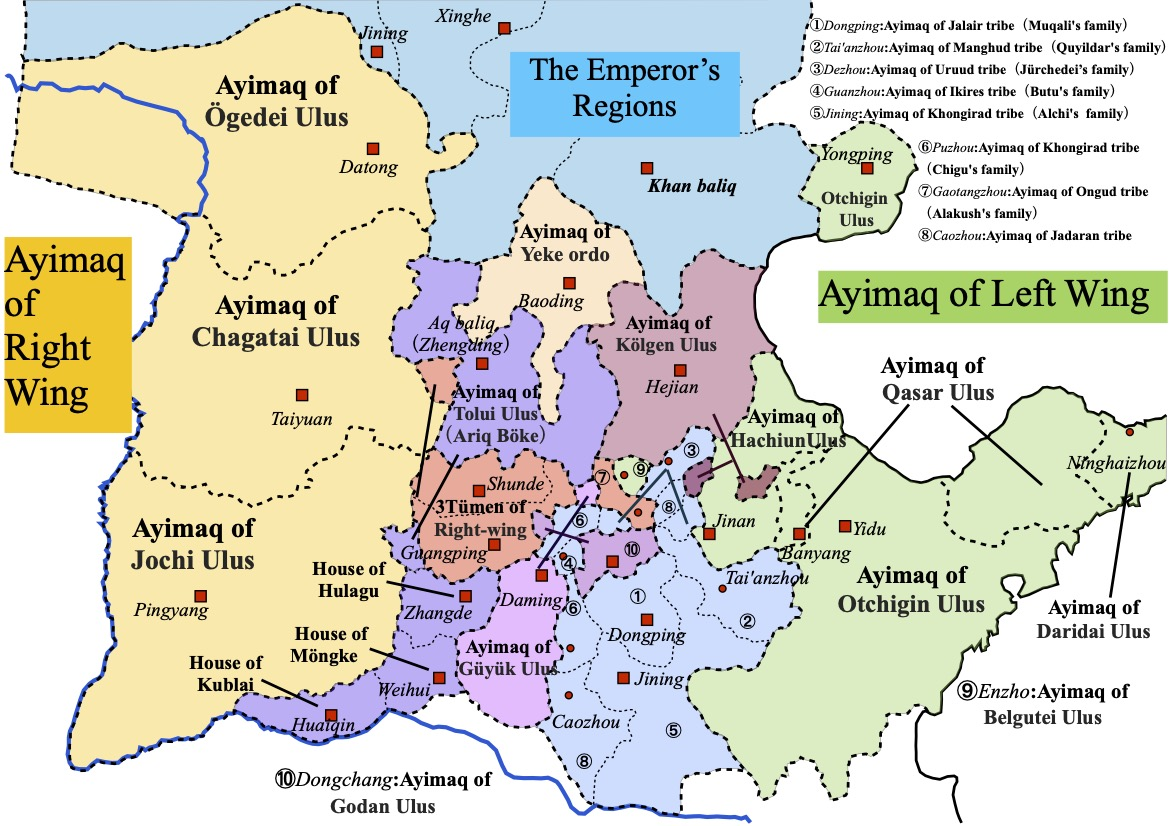
Mongol Empire's Ayimaq in North China

The most important part of the Yuan Empire was the Central Region, which covered the region of the Yuan capital Khanbaliq (Dadu, modern Beijing). The Central Region consisted of present-day Hebei, Shandong, Shanxi, the south-eastern part of present-day Inner Mongolia and the Henan areas to the north of the Yellow River. Since it was considered the most important region of the dynasty, it was directly governed by the Zhongshu Sheng at Khanbaliq; similarly, another top-level administrative department called the Bureau of Buddhist and Tibetan Affairs (or Xuanzheng Yuan) held administrative rule over Tibet.

Branch Secretariats (行中書省), or simply provinces (行省), were provincial-level administrative organizations or institutions subordinated to the Zhongshu Sheng, though they were not exactly provinces in modern sense. There were 11 "regular" provinces in Yuan dynasty.

Below the level of provinces, the largest political division was the circuit (道), followed by lù (路), fǔ (府) and zhōu (州). These are three kinds of prefecture-like divisions. The lowest political division was the xiàn or counties (縣).

Basically, lù is higher than fǔ, and fǔ is higher than zhōu. However, the actual relationship between them could be very complicated. Both lù, fǔ and zhōu could administer counties. Some fǔ and zhōu are directly administered by the province, while some exist inside a lù. A lù usually administers several counties, along with several fǔ and zhōu, and the fǔ or zhōu themselves could also administer their own counties. As a result, it is impossible to exactly define how many tiers of divisions there are under a province.

This government structure at the provincial level was later inherited and modified by the Ming and Qing dynasties.

== Regular provinces (Branch Secretariats) ==
1. Gansu province (甘肅行省) with Zhangye District as its seat of government. Under this came most of present-day Ningxia Hui Autonomous Region (originally the Tangut territory), south-eastern Gansu Province, and part of north-eastern Amdo. The Kingdom of Qocho (present-day Xinjiang) was ruled by the Chagatai Khanate and was never part of the Yuan.
2. Henan Jiangbei province (河南江北行省) with Kaifeng District as its seat of government. Under this came the Henan areas to the south of the Yellow River, north-east Hubei, Jiangsu, the north-eastern part of Jiangxi Province. Founded in 1268.
3. Huguang province (湖廣行省) with Wuhan of the present-day Hubei Province as its seat of government. Under this came a part of south-east Hubei, Hunan, Guangxi, most of Guizhou, and parts of south-western Guangdong Province. Founded in 1274.
4. Jiangxi province (江西行省) with Nanchang as its seat of government. Under this came part of present-day Jiangxi and Guangdong Province. Founded in 1277.
5. Jiangzhe province (江浙行省) with Hangzhou as its seat of government. Under this came Jiangsu and Anhui areas to the south of the Yangtze River, Zhejiang, Fujian, and a small area in the north-east of Jiangxi Province. Founded in 1276.
6. Liaoyang province (遼陽行省) with present-day Liaoyang District in Liaoning Province as its seat of government. Under this came north-east China, the northern part of Korea and the southern part of the Russian Far East.
7. Lingbei province (嶺北行省) with Karakorum as its seat of government. Under this province came the present-day Mongolia, northern Inner Mongolia and parts of Siberia.
8. Shaanxi province (陝西行省) with Xi'an as its seat of government. Under this came the majority of present-day Shaanxi Province, the south-western part of Inner Mongolia, south-eastern Gansu, north-western Sichuan, and a small part of Qinghai. Founded in 1260.
9. Sichuan province (四川行省) with Chengdu at its seat of government. Under this came most of the eastern half of present-day Sichuan Province, Chongqing, and parts of north-western Guizhou. Founded in 1294.
10. Yunnan province (雲南行省) with Kunming as its seat of government. Under this came present-day Yunnan Province, parts of western Guizhou and north-eastern part of Burma. The Duan family of the Dali Kingdom reigned in Dali as Maharajahs while the Governors served in Kunming. Founded in 1274.
11. Zhengdong province (征東行省) with Kaesong of present-day Korea as its seat of government. Despite being listed as a regular province, it was still special in that it had the king of Goryeo, who married to the imperial Mongol princesses, as its head, and Goryeo survived under Yuan overlordship. Furthermore, it was originally set up to invade Japan (see "Special provinces" below).

== Special provinces (Branch Secretariats) ==
These provinces or Branch Secretariats were set up before or during the invasions of certain regions outside the Yuan, such as Japan, Vietnam and Burma. They were usually abolished after the wars.

1. Zhengdong province (征東行省, lit. "Conquer East province"), also referred to as "Japanese Expedition province" (征日本行省): Originally set up during the invasion of Japan in 1281, with the king of Goryeo as its head. It was abolished when the invasion of Japan had failed. However, it was again set up in 1287, and gradually became a regular province which special characteristics (see "Regular province" above).
2. Zhengmian province (征緬行省, lit. "Conquer Burma province"), also referred to as "Middle of Burma province" (緬中行省), was the Branch Secretariat set up during the invasion of Burma.
3. Jiaozhi province (交趾行省), also known as Annan province (安南行省), was the Branch Secretariat set up during the invasion of Trần dynasty (Đại Việt or Jiaozhi).
4. Zhancheng province (占城行省), was the Branch Secretariat set up during the invasion of Champa.
5. Beshbalik province (别失八里行省), was the Branch Secretariat set up in Dzungaria (modern northern Xinjiang) during the Kaidu–Kublai war.

== Region under the Bureau of Buddhist and Tibetan Affairs ==
The Bureau of Buddhist and Tibetan Affairs, or Xuanzheng Yuan was a government agency and top-level administrative department set up in Khanbaliq that supervised Buddhist monks in addition to managing the territory of Tibet. Besides modern-day Tibet Autonomous Region, it also governed a part of Sichuan, Qinghai and Kashmir. It was separate from the other provinces of the Yuan dynasty such as those of former Song dynasty of China, but still under the administrative rule of the Yuan. While no modern equivalents remain, the political functions of the Bureau of Buddhist and Tibetan Affairs might have been analogous to the India Office in London during the British Raj. To emphasize its importance for Hangzhou, the capital of the former Southern Song dynasty, a branch (行) Xuanzheng Yuan was established in that city in 1291.

== See also ==
- Administrative divisions of the Tang dynasty
- Administrative divisions of the Liao dynasty
- Administrative divisions of the Qing dynasty
- Political divisions and vassals of the Mongol Empire
- Administration of territory in dynastic China
- Yuan dynasty in Inner Asia
