= List of Khitan rulers =

The Khitan people (Khitan small script: ; Chinese: 契丹; pinyin: Qìdān) were a historical para-Mongolic nomadic people from Northeast Asia who, from the 4th century, inhabited an area corresponding to parts of modern Mongolia, Northeast China and the Russian Far East. As a people they descended from the proto-Mongols through the Xianbei.

== The period of the Ancient Eight Tribes ==
- Hechen (何辰) a Khitan chieftain (baghatur) (契丹莫弗賀) (ca. 470)
- Mer-gan (Hanzi : 勿于 pinyin : Wuyu) another baghatur (ca. 479)
- Duomi Khagan (多彌可汗) (ca. 585)

== The Dahe Tribal Confederation (618-730) (大賀氏) ==
=== Governor-general of Songmo (松漠都督) ===
| Name of the clan | | (Khitan or granted Chinese) First name | | Period of reign |
| Chinese characters | Westernized | Chinese characters | Westernized | Period of reign |
|---|---|---|---|---|
| 大賀氏 | Dahe | 咄羅 | Duoluo | 618/622-627 |
| 大賀氏 | Dahe | 摩會 | Mohui | 627-644 |
| 大賀氏 | Dahe | 李窟哥 | (Li) Kuge | 644-653/658 |
| 大賀氏 | Dahe | 阿卜固 / 阿不固 | Abugu | 653/658-660 |
| Unknown | Unknown | Unknown | Unknown | 660-675 |
| 大賀氏 | Dahe | 李盡忠 | Li Jinzhong | 675-696 |
| 内稽氏 | Neiji tribe | 孫萬榮 | Sun Wanrong | 696-697 |
| 大賀氏 | Dahe | 李失活 | (Li) Shihuo | 697-717 |
| 大賀氏 | Dahe | 李娑固 / 李婆固 | (Li) Suogu / (Li) Pogu | 717-720 |
| 大賀氏 | Dahe | 李郁于 / 李鬱干 | (Li) Yuyu / (Li) Yugan | 720-722/724 |
| 大賀氏 | Dahe | 李吐于 / 李吐干 / 李咄于 | (Li) Tuyu / (Li) Tugan / (Li) Duoyu | 722/724-725 |
| 大賀氏 | Dahe | 李邵固 | (Li) Shaogu | 725-730 |

=== Prefecture of Xuanzhou (玄州) ===
Khitans tribes who did not belong to the Dahe confederation but living at the same period

| Name of the clan | | (Khitan or granted Chinese) First name | | Period of reign |
| Chinese characters | Westernized | Chinese characters | Westernized | Period of reign |
|---|---|---|---|---|
| | | (李)去閭 | (Li) Qulü | |
| | | 據曲 / 曲據 | Juqu / Quju | 646-648 |

=== Other Khitan chieftains (酋長) ===
- Tanmozhe (貪沒折) (ca. 630)

== The Yaonian Tribal Confederation (730-906) (遙輦氏) ==
=== The supreme chieftain of the Khitan (khagans) ===
| Title name | | (Khitan or granted Chinese) First name | | Period of reign |
| Chinese characters | Westernized | Chinese characters | Westernized | Period of reign |
|---|---|---|---|---|
| 洼可汗 | Wa khaghan | 屈列 | Julü (Qulie) | 730-734 |
| 北平郡王 | Prince of Beiping | 李過折 | (Li) Guozhe | 735 |
| 阻午可汗 | Zuwu Khagan | 俎里 (李懷秀/李懷節) | Zuli (Li) Huaixiu/(Li) Huaijie | 735-745 |
| 胡剌可汗 | Hula khaghan | 楷落 | Kailuo | 746-778 |
| 蘇可汗 | Su khaghan | Unknown | Unknown | 778-800 |
| 鮮質可汗 | Xianzhi khaghan | Unknown | Unknown | 800-820 |
| 昭古可汗 | Zhaogu khaghan | Unknown | Unknown | 820-842 |
| 耶瀾可汗 | Yelan khaghan | 屈戌 | Qushu | 842-860 |
| 巴剌可汗 | Bala khaghan | 習爾之 / 習爾 | Xi'erzhi / Xi'er | 860-882 |
| 痕德堇可汗 / 痕德可汗 | Hendeji khaghan/Hende khaghan | 欽德 | Qinde | 882-906 |

== Liao dynasty (916-1125) ==
There were nine emperors of the Liao dynasty, which at its height ruled over an area composing modern day Mongolia and northern China for over two hundred years. The emperors of the Liao dynasty were Khitans from Yelü clan.

Liao Dynasty 916–1125
| Temple Names (Miao Hao 廟號 miàohào) | Posthumous Names (Shi Hao 諡號 shìhào) | Birth Names | Period of Reigns | Era Names (Nian Hao 年號 niánhào) and their according range of years |
|---|---|---|---|---|
Convention: "Liao" + temple name except Liao Tianzuodi who is referred using "Liao" + posthumous name
| Taizu (太祖 Tàizǔ) | Shen Tian Huangdi | Yelü Abaoji (耶律阿保機 Yēlǜ Ābǎojī) | 916–926 | Shence (神冊 Shéncè) 916-922; Tianzan (天贊 Tiānzàn) 922-926 |
| Taizong (太宗 Tàizōng) | Xiao Wu Huangdi | Yelü Deguang (耶律德光 Yēlǜ Déguāng) | 926–947 | Tianxian (天顯 Tiānxiǎn) 926-937; Huitong (會同 Huìtóng) 937-947; Datong (大同 Dàtóng) 947 |
| Shizong (世宗 Shìzōng) | Tian Shou Huangdi | Yelü Ruan (耶律阮 Yēlǜ Ruǎn) | 947–951 | Tianlu (天祿 Tiānlù) 947-951 |
| Muzong (穆宗 Mùzōng) | | Yelü Jing (耶律璟 Yēlǜ Jǐng) | 951–969 | Yingli (應曆 Yìnglì) 951-969 |
| Jingzong (景宗 Jǐngzōng) | | Yelü Xian (耶律賢 Yēlǜ Xián) | 969–982 | Baoning (保寧 Bǎoníng) 969-979; Qianheng (乾亨 Qiánhēng) 979-982 |
| Shengzong (聖宗 Shèngzōng) | Wen Wu Da Xiao Xuan Huangdi | Yelü Longxu (耶律隆緒 Yēlǜ Lóngxù) | 982–1031 | Qianheng (乾亨 Qiánhēng) 982; Tonghe (統和 Tǒnghé) 983-1012; Kaitai (開泰 Kāitài) 1012-1021; Taiping (太平 Tàipíng) 1021-1031 |
| Xingzong (興宗 Xīngzōng) | Xiao Zheng Huangdi | Yelü Zongzhen (耶律宗真 Yēlǜ Zōngzhēn) | 1031–1055 | Jingfu (景福 Jǐngfú) 1031-1032; Chongxi (重熙 Chóngxī) 1032-1055 |
| Daozong (道宗 Dàozōng) | | Yelü Hongji (耶律洪基 Yēlǜ Hóngjī) | 1055–1101 | Qingning (清寧 Qīngníng) 1055-1064; Xianyong (咸雍 Xiányōng) 1065-1074; Taikang (太康 Tàikāng) or Dakang (大康 Dàkāng) 1075-1084; Da'an (大安 Dà'ān) 1085-1094; Shouchang (壽昌 Shòuchāng) or Shoulong (壽隆 Shòulóng) 1095-1101 |
| | Tianzuodi (天祚帝 Tiānzuòdì) | Yelü Yanxi (耶律延禧 Yēlǜ Yánxǐ) | 1101–1125 | Qiantong (乾統 Qiántǒng) 1101-1110; Tianqing (天慶 Tiānqìng) 1111-1120; Baoda (保大 Bǎodà) 1121-1125 |

== Qara Khitai/Western Liao (1124-1218) ==
Sovereigns of Qara Khitai 1124–1218
| Temple Names (Miao Hao 廟號 miàohào) | Posthumous Names (Shi Hao 諡號 shìhào) | Birth Names | Convention | Period of Reign | Era Names (Nian Hao 年號 niánhào) and their according range of years |
|---|---|---|---|---|---|
| Dezong (德宗 Dézōng) | Tianyouwuliedi (天祐武烈帝 Tiānyòuwǔlièdì) | Yelü Dashi (耶律大石 Yēlǜ Dàshí or 耶律達實 Yēlǜ Dáshí) ^{1} | use birth name | 1124–1144 | Yanqing (延慶 Yánqìng) 1124 or 1125–1134 Kangguo (康國 Kāngguó) 1134–1144 |
| Did not exist | Gantianhou (感天后 Gǎntiānhòu) | Tabuyan (塔不煙 Tǎbùyān) | "Xi Liao" + posthumous name | 1144–1150 | Xianqing (咸清 Xiánqīng) 1144–1150 |
| Emperor Renzong of Western Liao (仁宗 Rénzōng) | Too tedious thus not used when referring to this sovereign | Yelü Yilie (耶律夷列 Yēlǜ Yíliè) | "Xi Liao" + temple name | 1150–1164 | Shaoxing (紹興 Shàoxīng) or Xuxing (Xùxīng 續興)^{2} 1150–1164 |
| Did not exist | Chengtianhou (承天后 Chéngtiānhòu) | Yelü Pusuwan (耶律普速完 Yēlǜ Pǔsùwán) | "Xi Liao" + posthumous name | 1164–1178 | Chongfu (崇福 Chóngfú) 1164–1178 |
| Did not exist | Mozhu (末主 Mòzhǔ) or Modi (末帝 Mòdì) | Yelü Zhilugu (耶律直魯古 Yēlǜ Zhílǔgǔ) | use birth name | 1178–1211 | Tianxi (天禧 Tiānxī) 1178–1218 |
| Did not exist | Did not exist | Kuchlug (Ch. 屈出律 Qūchūlǜ) | use birth name | 1211–1218 | |
1 "Dashi" might be the Chinese title "Taishi", meaning "vizier"; or, it could mean "Stone" in Turkish, as the Chinese transliteration suggests. 2 Recently discovered Western Liao coins have the era name "Xuxing", suggesting that the era name "Shaoxing" recorded in Chinese sources may be incorrect.

== Remarks ==
The family name Li is a "rewarded" name being similar to the Emperor's name Li of the Tang dynasty.

== See also ==
- Khitan people
- History of the Khitans
